= Ashutosh =

Ashutosh (Sanskrit: आशुतोष āśutoṣa, from आशु āśu meaning "rapid, easy" and तोष toṣa meaning "gratification") is a male given name and one of the names given to Shiva. The word Ashutosh refers to someone who can be easily gratified and someone who fulfils wishes instantly. Ashutosh is one of the thousand names (Sahasra naam) of Mahadeva.

== Persons ==
=== Given name ===
- Ashutosh Deb (1803–1856), musician and Hindu priest in Calcutta, producer of an early Bengali dictionary
- Ashutosh Lobo Gajiwala (born 1993), Indian actor
- Ashutosh Gowariker (born 1965), Indian film director, actor, writer and producer
- Ashutosh (politician) (born 1965), Indian journalist and politician
- Ashutosh Kaushik, Indian model, actor, reality TV personality
- Ashutosh Mukherjee (1864–1924), Bengali educator
- Ashutosh Mukhopadhyay, anglicized spelling of surname: Mukherjee, prominent writer of modern Bengali literature
- Ashutosh Phatak, Indian rock artist and composer
- Ashutosh Rana, Indian actor
- Ashutosh Sabharwal, American engineer
- Ashutosh Sharma
  - Ashutosh Sharma (chemical engineer) (born 1961), Professor at the Indian Institute of Technology Kanpur
  - Ashutosh Sharma (colonel), Indian Army officer killed in action in 2020
  - Ashutosh Sharma (cricketer) (born 1998), Indian cricketer

== Other uses ==
- Asutosh College, affiliated to the University of Calcutta
