= Gerald Lathbury =

British Army general (1906–1978)

General Sir Gerald Lathbury GCB DSO MBE
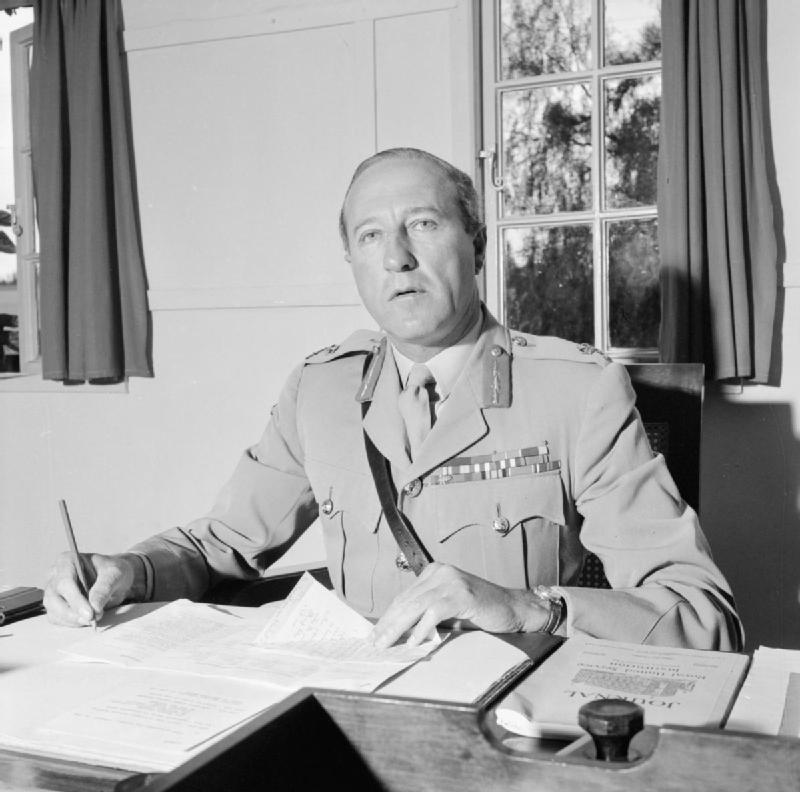
- General Sir Gerald Lathbury, seen here as Commander-in-chief (C-in-C), East Africa, in May 1955.
- Born: 14 July 1906; Murree, British India
- Died: 16 May 1978 (aged 71); Mortimer, Berkshire, England
- Military career
- Allegiance: United Kingdom
- Branch: British Army
- Service years: 1926–1965
- Rank: General
- Nickname: "Legs"
- Service number: 34384
- Unit: Oxfordshire and Buckinghamshire Light Infantry
- Commands: 3rd Parachute Battalion; 3rd Parachute Brigade; 1st Parachute Brigade; 16th Airborne Division; Staff College, Camberley; East Africa Command; Eastern Command
- Conflicts: Second World War; Palestine Emergency
- Awards: Knight Grand Cross of the Order of the Bath; Companion of the Distinguished Service Order; Member of the Order of the British Empire; Mentioned in despatches
- Other work: Governor of Gibraltar

General Sir Gerald William Lathbury, GCB, DSO, MBE (14 July 1906 – 16 May 1978) was a senior British Army officer who fought during the Second World War, serving with distinction with the British Army's airborne forces, commanding the 1st Parachute Brigade in Sicily, Italy and Holland. He later became Governor of Gibraltar from 1965 to 1969.

== Early life and military career ==
Gerald Lathbury was born in Murree, British India on 14 July 1906 into a military family, his father being Colonel (Henry) Oscar Lathbury. Returning to England, he was educated at Wellington College, Berkshire and the Royal Military College, Sandhurst. Passing out from Sandhurst, Lathbury was commissioned as a second lieutenant into the Oxfordshire and Buckinghamshire Light Infantry on 4 February 1926. He was seconded to the Royal West African Frontier Force and Gold Coast Regiment between 1928 and 1932 and, returning to England, attended the Staff College, Camberley between 1937 and 1938. Promoted to lieutenant on 4 February 1929, he was a captain on 21 March 1938. In January 1939 he became brigade major with the 8th Infantry Brigade, which formed part of the 3rd Infantry Division, whose general officer commanding (GOC) was Major General Denis Bernard until he was succeeded in August by Major General Bernard Montgomery, shortly before the Second World War began the following month.

== Second World War ==
Soon after the war began the 3rd Division was sent to France where it became one of four divisions forming the initial British Expeditionary Force (BEF), although there was no immediate action. On 29 February 1940, Lathbury, promoted to the acting rank of major, was posted to the 48th (South Midland) Infantry Division as a General staff Officer Grade 2 (GSO2). The division, commanded by Major General Andrew Thorne, was a first line Territorial Army (TA) formation which had only recently arrived in France. The German Army launched their invasion of France just over two months later, and the 48th Division, along with most of the rest of the BEF, was forced to retreat to Dunkirk, from where most of it was evacuated at Dunkirk. For his services in France and Belgium Lathbury was made a Member of the Order of the British Empire. For the rest of the year the division was in South West England on anti-invasion duties.

In September 1941, however, Lathbury's career took a sharp upwards turn as, interested in the British Army's newly created airborne forces, he was made commanding officer (CO) of the 3rd Parachute Battalion. The battalion was one of three − the others being Ernest Down's 1st and Edwin Flavell's 2nd Parachute Battalions − which formed part of Brigadier Richard Gale's 1st Parachute Brigade, which in December became part of the 1st Airborne Division, whose GOC was Major General Frederick Browning. Lathbury – "a very tall man, slight of build and with a deep crackling voice; his very presence demanded attention" – trained his battalion very hard over the next few months until, in May 1942, he was posted as a GSO1 to the Air Directorate at the War Office.

In December, however, he returned to the command of troops when he was promoted to the acting rank of brigadier and was given command of the 3rd Parachute Brigade, taking over from Brigadier Alexander Stanier. The brigade, part of the 1st Airborne Division, still under Browning, was a recent creation, comprising the 7th, 8th and 9th Parachute Battalions, all of which had formerly been infantry battalions converted into parachute battalions, along with supporting units. Created to replace the 1st Parachute Brigade after it was detached to fight in North Africa (see British airborne operations in North Africa), Lathbury, as he had done with the 3rd Para Battalion the previous year, put the 3rd Para Brigade through a series of gruelling training exercises, before, in mid-April 1943, he was selected to command the 1st Para Brigade in North Africa, in succession to Brigadier Edwin Flavell, handing over the 3rd Para Brigade to Brigadier James Hill.

The brigade, which as previously mentioned had been detached from its parent 1st Airborne Division, had just been engaged in hard fighting in the Tunisian campaign, and had sustained heavy losses. Lathbury took part in the landings in Sicily (Operation Husky), his brigade being tasked with the capture of the Primosole Bridge, where he was wounded in the back and both thighs, although he remained in command until reinforcement arrived. He was appointed a Companion of the Distinguished Service Order (DSO) for this action. The citation reads:

This officer organised and led the attack by the 1st Parachute Brigade on a vital river crossing South of Catania in Sicily on the night 13th/14th July 1943. Although dropped by parachute 1.5 miles away, from a height of only 100 feet Brigadier Lathbury reached the objective, took part in its capture and directed the consolidation, during which he was wounded. Later, during a heavy counterattack by German parachutists, he remained at the bridge where he fought alongside his troops and provided an example and inspiration which contributed in no small degree to the success of the operation.

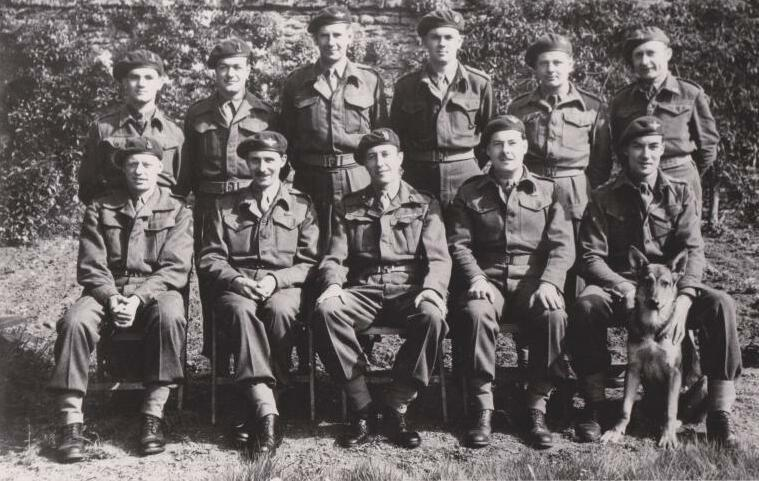
Brigadier Lathbury (seated in the centre), commanding the 1st Para Brigade, along with members of his brigade staff, May 1944.

Lathbury was still in command of the 1st Parachute Brigade during the Battle of Arnhem, part of Operation Market Garden in the Netherlands. On 18 September 1944 he was cut off from his command while in the company of Major General Roy Urquhart, the division's GOC, when he was badly wounded in the left leg and his spine was chipped, leaving him temporarily paralysed. Lathbury was left in the care of a local Dutch family and became a prisoner of war. He concealed his rank, pretending to be a lance corporal. He later escaped with help of the Dutch resistance by simply walking out of the main doors of the hospital in which he was held. The Dutch resistance put him in touch with other hiding British soldiers. Lathbury, along with Lieutenant Colonel David Dobie and Major Digby Tatham-Warter, organised an escape across the Rhine. Lathbury and Digby crossed the Rhine on 22 October with 137 personnel, linking up with US paratroopers of First lieutenant Frederick Heyliger's Company E of the 2nd Battalion, 506th Parachute Infantry Regiment, part of the U.S 101st Airborne Division. Lathbury was portrayed by Donald Douglas in the 1977 film A Bridge Too Far.

For his services during Market Garden and after, he was awarded the Distinguished Service Cross by the United States. The model's citation reads:

On 17th September at Arnhem, Brigadier Lathbury commanded the 1st Parachute Brigade whose task was to seize the main road bridge in the town.

He conducted the advance of his Brigade from the Drop Zone, some 8 miles away, with great vigour until he was cut off from his Headquarters. He then took part in street fighting with one of his Battalions until he was wounded on 18th September and taken to hospital. During the night 24/25th September, seeing that those who were wounded and fit to move, were being evacuated from the hospital to Germany, Brigadier Lathbury although not fully recovered left the hospital and tried to rejoin the Division. He was unable to do this as the latter had been withdrawn to the south bank of the river that night. With the aid of the Dutch Resistance Movement he evaded capture and remained in hiding until he escaped across the river with the party which reached our lines on the 23rd October.

The leadership which this officer displayed during the advance and his determination to escape capture is worthy of the highest praise.

On 9 May 1945 Brigadier Lathbury arrived in Copenhagen to oversee the surrender of German forces in Denmark as part of Operation Eclipse.

== Postwar ==
Lathbury remained with the 1st Para Brigade, which did not see any further action during the war, and in July 1945 returned to his old 3rd Para Brigade as its commander. The brigade formed part of the 6th Airborne Division, then under Major General Eric Bols, and was sent with the rest of the division to Palestine towards the end of the year, at the height of the Palestine Emergency (see 6th Airborne Division in Palestine).

Returning to England, he attended the Imperial Defence College as a student in 1948. He was appointed GOC of the 16th Airborne Division in 1948 and then Commandant of the Staff College, Camberley in 1951. He went on to be Commander-in-chief (C-in-C) of East Africa Command in 1955 and, returning to England, Director General of Military Training at the War Office in 1957. As C-in-C East Africa he played a vital role in defeating the Mau-Mau terrorists. He became General Officer Commanding-in-Chief (GOC-in-C) of Eastern Command in 1960 and Quartermaster-General to the Forces the following year. Finally he was appointed Governor of Gibraltar in 1964; he retired in 1969. He was described as radiating "a serene imperturbability" by Joshua Hassan, who was a Chief Minister of Gibraltar. Lathbury's composure was invaluable at the time as the politics meant there was doubts over the status of Gibraltar, with questions being asked at the United Nations. This made the locals nervous, especially as there was a de facto freeze on take home pay in Gibraltar.

He was also an Aide-de-camp general to the Queen from 1962 to 1965 as well as Colonel Commandant of both the 1st Green Jackets (43rd and 52nd) and the Parachute Regiment from 1961 to 1965. In 1965 he participated in the third of the series of Harold Hall Australian ornithological collecting expeditions.

== Family ==
In 1942 he married Jean Gordon Thin: they had two daughters. In 1972 he married Mairi Zoë Gibbs, widow of Patrick Somerset Gibbs. He died in 1978. There is a Lathbury Barracks in Gibraltar and Jamaica at the Jamaica Defence Force Headquarters at Up Park Camp in Kingston.

== Bibliography ==
- Dover, Major Victor (1981). The Sky Generals. Cassell. ISBN 0-304-30480-8.

Military offices
Preceded by Roy Urquhart	GOC 16th Airborne Division; 1948–1951	Succeeded by Geoffrey Bourne
Preceded by Dudley Ward	Commandant of the Staff College, Camberley; 1951–1954	Succeeded by Charles Jones
Preceded by Sir George Erskine	GOC East Africa Command; 1955–1957	Succeeded by Sir Nigel Tapp
Preceded by Sir James Cassels	GOC-in-C Eastern Command; 1960–1961	Succeeded by Sir Roderick McLeod
Preceded by Sir Cecil Sugden	Quartermaster-General to the Forces; 1961–1965	Succeeded by Sir Charles Richardson
Government offices
Preceded by Sir Dudley Ward	Governor of Gibraltar; 1965–1969	Succeeded by Sir Varyl Begg
