= 3rd Parachute Brigade =

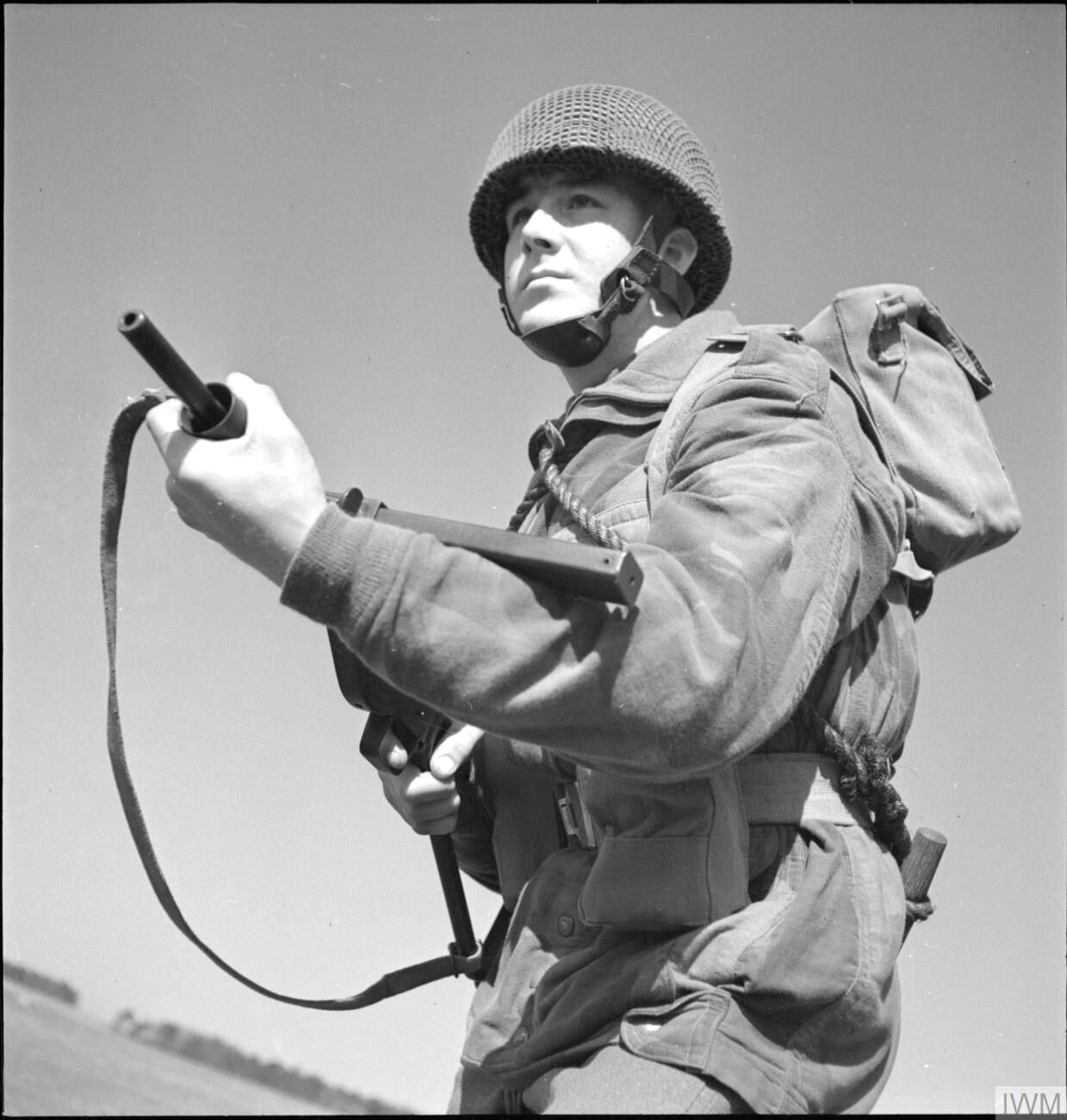
- Paratrooper of the brigade's 8th Battalion, Parachute Regiment, pictured here with a Sten gun.
- Active: 1942–1948
- Country: United Kingdom
- Branch: British Army
- Type: Parachute Infantry
- Role: Airborne forces
- Size: Brigade
- Part of: 1st Airborne Division; 6th Airborne Division
- Nickname: Red Devils (Note: The 1st Parachute Brigade had been called the "Rote Teufel" or "Red Devils" by the German troops they had fought in North Africa. The title was officially confirmed by General Sir Harold Alexander and henceforth applied to all British airborne troops.)
- Engagements: Normandy landings Operation Tonga; Battle of Merville Gun Battery; 6th Airborne Division advance to the River Seine; Battle of the Bulge; Operation Varsity; Advance to the Baltic; Palestine

Commanders
- Notable commanders: Gerald Lathbury; James Hill

Insignia
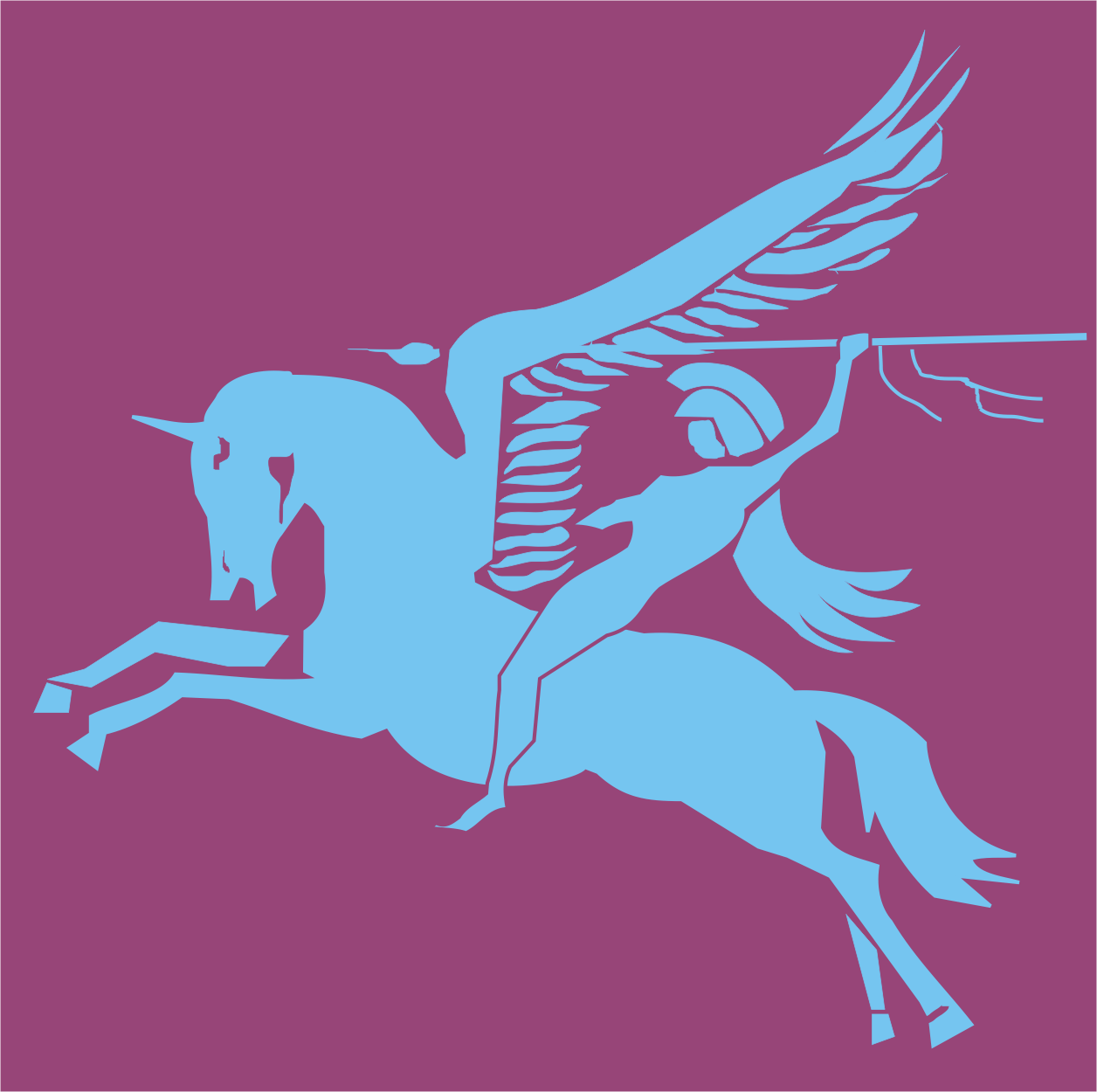
- Emblem of the British airborne forces

The 3rd Parachute Brigade was an airborne forces brigade raised by the British Army during the Second World War. The brigade was initially part of the 1st Airborne Division, but remained in Britain when that division was sent overseas, and became part of the 6th Airborne Division, alongside 5th Parachute Brigade and 6th Airlanding Brigade.

The brigade first went into action on 5 June 1944 during Operation Tonga, part of the Normandy landings. The objective was to destroy the Merville Gun Battery and the bridges over the River Dives. The brigade achieved all its objectives, and remained defending the left flank of the invasion zone until mid August. They then crossed the River Dives and advanced as far as the River Seine before they were withdrawn. While recovering in England, the brigade was moved to Belgium in December 1944, to counter the German attack in the Ardennes. The brigade remained on the border between Belgium and the Netherlands carrying out patrols until March 1945. Their next airborne mission was Operation Varsity, the assault crossing of the River Rhine in Germany. After this, the brigade advanced towards the Baltic Sea, arriving just ahead of the Red Army.

Still part of the 6th Airborne Division, the brigade was sent to the British mandate of Palestine in October 1945 after the end of the war. Carrying out an internal security role with the rest of 6th Airborne Division, it remained in Palestine until it was disbanded in 1947.

== Background ==
Impressed by the success of German airborne operations during the Battle of France, the British Prime Minister, Winston Churchill, directed the War Office to investigate the possibility of creating a force of 5,000 parachute troops. As a result, on 22 June 1940, No. 2 Commando assumed parachute duties, and on 21 November was re-designated the 11th Special Air Service Battalion, with a parachute and glider wing.

On 21 June 1940 the Central Landing Establishment was formed at Ringway airfield near Manchester. Although tasked primarily with training parachute troops, it was also directed to investigate the use of gliders to transport troops into battle. At the same time, the Ministry of Aircraft Production contracted General Aircraft Ltd to design and produce a glider for this purpose. The result was the General Aircraft Hotspur, an aircraft capable of transporting eight soldiers, that was used for both assault and training purposes.

The success of the first British airborne raid, Operation Colossus, prompted the War Office to expand the airborne force through the creation of the Parachute Regiment, and to develop plans to convert several infantry battalions into parachute and glider battalions. On 31 May 1941, a joint army and air force memorandum was approved by the Chiefs-of-Staff and Winston Churchill; it recommended that the British airborne forces should consist of two parachute brigades, one based in England and the other in the Middle East, and that a glider force of 10,000 men should be created.

== Formation ==
The 3rd Parachute Brigade was raised on 7 November 1942, under the command of Brigadier Sir Alexander Stanier. Stanier was soon replaced by Brigadier Gerald Lathbury, who in turn was replaced in May 1943 by Brigadier James Hill, previously of the 1st Parachute Brigade. Hill remained in command through the remaining war years until July 1945, when Lathbury once again assumed command. The last commander of the brigade was Brigadier Francis Rome, who took over on 15 November 1946.

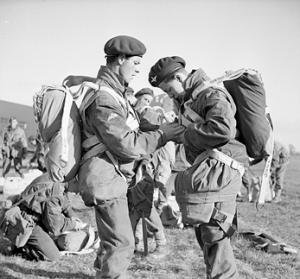
Parachute troops during Exercise Mush, April 1944

The brigade was initially composed of the 7th (Light Infantry) Parachute Battalion, the 8th (Midlands) Parachute Battalion and the 9th (Eastern and Home Counties) Parachute Battalion. On 11 August 1943 the 1st Canadian Parachute Battalion arrived in England and was assigned to the brigade, and the 7th Battalion was transferred to the 5th Parachute Brigade which was in the process of forming. At the end of the Second World War, the 1st Canadian Battalion returned to Canada, and was replaced in the brigade by the 3rd Parachute Battalion, which had previously been part of the 1st Parachute Brigade.

The brigade's other units were the 3rd Airlanding Anti-Tank Battery from the Royal Artillery, the 3rd Parachute Squadron of the Royal Engineers and the 224th (Parachute) Field Ambulance from the Royal Army Medical Corps. During operations the artillery support available to the brigade would also include a battery of howitzers from the 53rd (Worcester Yeomanry) Airlanding Light Regiment, although it was not part of the brigade.

On formation the brigade was assigned to the 1st Airborne Division, and as such had to supply reinforcements to make the 1st Parachute Brigade up to strength before they left to take part in Operation Torch. When the 1st Airborne Division left England for operations in the Mediterranean, the 3rd Parachute Brigade remained behind, and was assigned as the first unit of the newly raised 6th Airborne Division. The brigade would remain part of the 6th Airborne Division until 1947, when it was disbanded.

== Operational history ==
From June to December 1943, the brigade prepared for operations as part of the 6th Airborne Division, training at every level from section up to division by day and night. Airborne soldiers were expected to fight against superior numbers of the enemy, who would be equipped with artillery and tanks. Training was therefore designed to encourage a spirit of self-discipline, self-reliance and aggressiveness, with emphasis given to physical fitness, marksmanship and fieldcraft. A large part of the training consisted of assault courses and route marching. Military exercises included capturing and holding airborne bridgeheads, road or rail bridges and coastal fortifications. At the end of most exercises, the troops would march back to their barracks, usually a distance of around 20 miles (32 km). An ability to cover long distances at speed was expected; airborne platoons were required to cover a distance of 50 miles (80 km) in 24 hours, and battalions 32 miles (51 km).

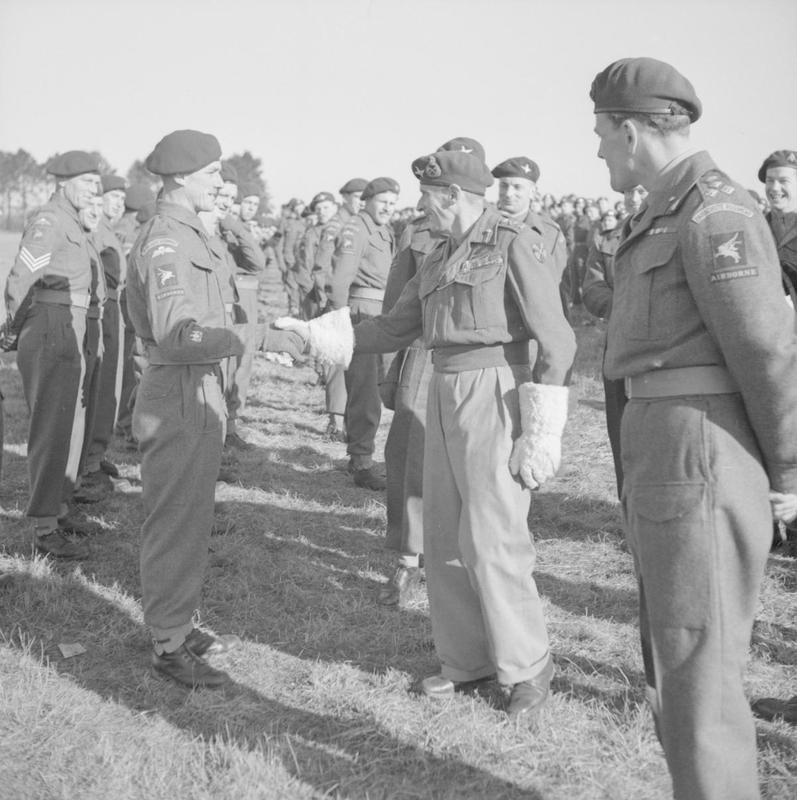
General Sir Bernard Montgomery greets RSM A. Parsons of the 8th (Midlands) Parachute Battalion during an inspection of the 6th Airborne Division at Bulford, Wiltshire, 8 March 1944. Stood closest to the camera is the brigade's commander, Brigadier "Speedy" Hill.

In April 1944, under the command of 1st Airborne Corps, the brigade took part in Exercise Mush, in the counties of Gloucestershire, Oxfordshire and Wiltshire. This was an airborne military exercise spread over three days involving the 1st and 6th Airborne Divisions. Unknown to the 6th Airborne, it was a full-scale rehearsal for the division's involvement in the imminent Normandy invasion. In the invasion, the division's two parachute brigades would land just after midnight on 6 June, while the 6th Airlanding Brigade arrived later in the day just before dark. The division's objective was to secure the left flank of the invasion area by dominating the high ground in the area between the rivers Orne and Dives. For their part in the operation, the 3rd Parachute Brigade had to destroy the Merville Gun Battery, whose guns were in range of the Sword Beach landings, and to demolish bridges across the River Dives to hamper the arrival of German reinforcements from the east.

=== D-Day ===
Just after midnight on 6 June 1944, Albemarle aircraft arrived, carrying the brigade's pathfinders, a company from the 1st Canadian Battalion to clear the drop zone (DZ) of obstructions, a group from each battalion, and brigade headquarters. Some planes got lost and failed to reach the DZ or arrived late. Others were damaged before dropping all their paratroops and turned back, and one returned to base after failing to find the drop zone at all.

From around 00:50 the rest of the brigade arrived in Normandy after crossing the English Channel, transported in 108 C-47 Dakotas, along with 17 Horsa gliders carrying their heavy equipment. The 8th Parachute Battalion, landing on DZ-K along with the brigade headquarters, was tasked with destroying the bridges over the River Dives at Bures and Troarn. The 1st Canadian Battalion, landing on DZ-V, was required to destroy the bridges at Varaville and Robehomme. The 9th Battalion, also landing on DZ-V, had arguably the hardest task; neutralising the Merville Gun Battery. (Note: Some sources claim the 9th Parachute Battalion had the "most critical of all tasks assigned to the 6th Airborne Division.") Due to a combination of poor navigation, heavy cloud cover, and several of the drop zones not being marked correctly, the parachute drop was widely scattered. One group of paratroops landed 10 miles (16 km) away, and another landed on the wrong side of the River Orne, only 1,200 yards (1,100 m) from the invasion beaches. Less than half of each battalion gathered at their individual assembly areas.

In the south, at DZ-K, only 141 men of the 8th Parachute Battalion had assembled. Divided into two groups, they headed for their objectives. One group demolished the two bridges at Bures without opposition. The other group, while on their way to Troarn, intercepted and ambushed a convoy of six armoured vehicles belonging to the 21st Panzer Division. When they reached Troarn, they discovered it was defended by the Germans. A platoon, including engineers, managed to fight their way to the bridge. They found that it had already been damaged, so the engineers planted their explosives and enlarged the gap to around 70 feet (21 m).

The 1st Canadian Battalion successfully destroyed the bridges at Varaville and Robehomme after landing on the northern DZ. They then withdrew to defend Le Mesnil, where the brigade headquarters and the field ambulance were located. Meanwhile, by 02:50 only 150 men of the 9th Parachute Battalion had gathered at their assembly area, with virtually no heavy weapons or supplies. Unable to wait any longer, they headed for the Merville Gun Battery. The battalion captured the battery, but without explosives, could only damage two of its four guns. The battle had been costly, and only 85 men were left to head for their secondary objective, the village of Le Plein. The village was defended in strength by the Germans, and the weakened battalion could only dig in and wait the arrival of commandos from the 1st Special Service Brigade later that day. By nightfall the brigade was deployed facing east, along the ridge of high ground from Le Plein in the north to the Bois de Bavent in the south.

=== Orne bridgehead ===
On 7 June, the 9th Parachute Battalion, relieved by the Special Service Brigade commandos, moved southwards to the Bois de Mont near Bréville, shortening the front held by the 3rd Parachute Brigade. The 6th Airborne Division's deployments now had the 6th Airlanding Brigade in the south, holding a line between Longueville and Herourvillette, the 5th Parachute Brigade to the rear just to the east of the River Orne bridge, the attached 1st Special Service Brigade to the north with troops in Sallenelles and Franceville-Plage, and finally the 3rd Parachute Brigade holding the ridge of high ground to the east.

The Germans still held the village of Bréville, between the 3rd Parachute and 1st Special Service Brigades, which gave them a vantage point to observe the airborne division's positions. On 8 June the Germans launched a two pronged attack from Bréville, against the commandos and against the 9th Parachute Battalion. The German force, comprising elements of the 857th Grenadier Regiment, 346th Infantry Division, were only driven back by a counterattack led by the 9th Parachute Battalion's Regimental Sergeant Major. The next morning the 9th Parachute Battalion was the target for a heavy mortar bombardment, followed by two further infantry attacks. Later the same morning, the 3rd Parachute Brigade's headquarters was attacked by German troops who had infiltrated the lines. The brigade defence platoon managed to hold out until a counterattack by the 9th Parachute Battalion cleared the enemy away. On 10 June, 31 men who had landed in the wrong locations joined the battalion, bringing their numbers up to 270 all ranks. The fighting was now concentrated around the Château Saint Come, which was occupied by a German infantry company supported by two self propelled guns. One of the self-propelled guns was blown up by Vickers machine gun fire, but the Germans then mounted a determined infantry assault, and the battalion had to call for support from HMS Arethusa. The leading German troops were undaunted by the naval bombardment, and reached the battalion's lines before they were stopped. One of the German prisoners was a battalion commander, who informed his captors that the 875th Grenadier Regiment had been virtually destroyed in the previous day's fighting. That evening the 9th Parachute Battalion captured the Château Saint Come, and was involved in skirmishes throughout the night. The following day, 11 June, the 5th Battalion Black Watch was attached to the brigade to assist in their attempt to capture Bréville, but their attacks were repulsed by the Germans with heavy losses. They tried again on the 12th, and the German response was an attack by infantry supported by armour, which not only drove the Black Watch back, but almost overran the 9th Parachute Battalion's position. The situation was only saved by a counterattack by 'A' Company 1st Canadian Battalion under the command of Brigadier Hill.

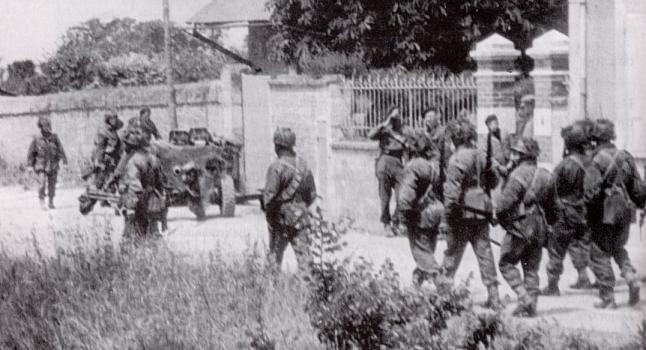
Men of the 9th Parachute Battalion in Amfreville, near the hotly contested village of Breville

During this time the 8th Battalion, located in the thick forest of the Bois de Bavant, were under an almost constant mortar bombardment. Not being directly attacked, the battalion concentrated on night time patrols to harass the Germans, some going as far as the German occupied villages of Troan and Bures.

On 7 June 1 Canadian Parachute Battalion at Le Mesnil was attacked by units from the 857th and 858th Grenadier Regiments, supported by tanks and self-propelled guns. The battalion inflicted heavy casualties on the Germans, but only managed to drive them back with a bayonet charge by 'B' Company. The next day the battalion was involved in several small battles, and on 9 June sent a reconnaissance patrol to check if the Germans were still occupying Bavent. The patrol was driven back by a strong German force, but that night another patrol entered the village and planted explosive charges on weapons and in buildings. Attacks by German infantry and armour continued until the night of the 12/13 June, when Bréville was finally captured by the division's only reserves, a mixed force from the 12th Parachute Battalion and 12th Devonshire Battalion supported by a troop of tanks from the 13th/18th Royal Hussars. On 13 June the 51st (Highland) Infantry Division crossed the River Orne from the west, and took over responsibility for the southern sector of the Orne bridgehead. At the same time the 4th Special Service Brigade was attached to the 6th Airborne Division, which gave them the ability to rotate one brigade at a time out of the front line to allow them to rest. The 3rd Parachute Brigade, having suffered more casualties than the division's other brigades, was the first formation relieved.

=== Advance to the Seine ===
With the capture of Breville the division was not attacked in force again, apart from an almost continuous artillery bombardment between 18 and 20 June. Further reinforcements arrived east of the River Orne on 20 July; the 49th (West Riding) Infantry Division moved into the line between the 6th Airborne and the Highland Division. Then on 7 August, the 6th Airborne Division was ordered to prepare to move over to the offensive, with its objective being the mouth of the River Seine. The three divisions east of the Orne now became I Corps, and when issuing his orders Lieutenant General John Crocker, aware that the 6th Airborne had almost no artillery, vehicles or engineer equipment, did not expect them to advance very quickly. To reach the Seine the division would have to cross three major rivers, and there were only two main lines of advance; one road running along the coast and another further inland from Troarn to Pont Audemer.

On 17 August the Germans started to withdraw northwards. The divisional commander had already decided that the 3rd Parachute Brigade would lead the advance along the interior road. Their objective was to capture Bures, cross the River Dives and secure the area between there and Dozulé. At 03:00 the brigade attacked the retreating Germans. By 08:00 the 8th and 9th Battalions had captured Bures, and the 1st Canadian Parachute Battalion moved through the Bois de Bavant. The bridges in Bures had been blown up previously, and it took the brigade's engineers until the afternoon to build a crossing. By 21:00 the brigade had crossed the Dives and halted with the 8th Parachute Battalion out in front at Goustranville. The 1st Canadian Parachute Battalion was behind them, and the 9th Parachute Battalion in reserve. The next day the brigade met heavy resistance just beyond Goustranville, on the Dives Canal and at Dozulé train station. The 1st Canadian Parachute Battalion had taken over the advance and were ordered to seize four bridges crossing the canal. The assault began at 22:00; at 22:35 the railway bridge in the north had been captured, and by midnight all four bridges were secured with 150 prisoners taken. The 9th Parachute Battalion then passed through the Canadians and crossed the next water obstacle without boats, as they found the water was only 4 feet (1.2 m) deep. At 01:00 on 19 August they reached Dozulé. It was not until 07:00 on 21 August that the advance restarted, with the objective of Pont-l'Evêque on the River Touques. After a hard battle the 8th Parachute Battalion captured Annebault, and the 5th Parachute Brigade then took over as the division's lead unit. On 24 August the 3rd Parachute Brigade and 4th Special Service Brigade captured Beuzeville, and the 5th Parachute Brigade reached Pont Audemer, which was the division's last objective. On 27 August the division was ordered to concentrate in the area between Honfleur and Pont Audemer and prepare to return to England.

In nine days of fighting the 6th Airborne Division had advanced 45 miles (72 km), despite, as the divisional commander Major-General Richard Gale put it, his infantry units being "quite inadequately equipped for a rapid pursuit". They had captured 400 square miles (1,000 km^{2}) of territory and taken over 1,000 German prisoners. Since landing on 6 June, the division's casualties were 4,457, of which 821 were killed, 2,709 wounded and 927 missing. The 3rd Parachute Brigade had 207 killed. The division was withdrawn from France and embarked for England at the beginning of September.

=== Ardennes ===
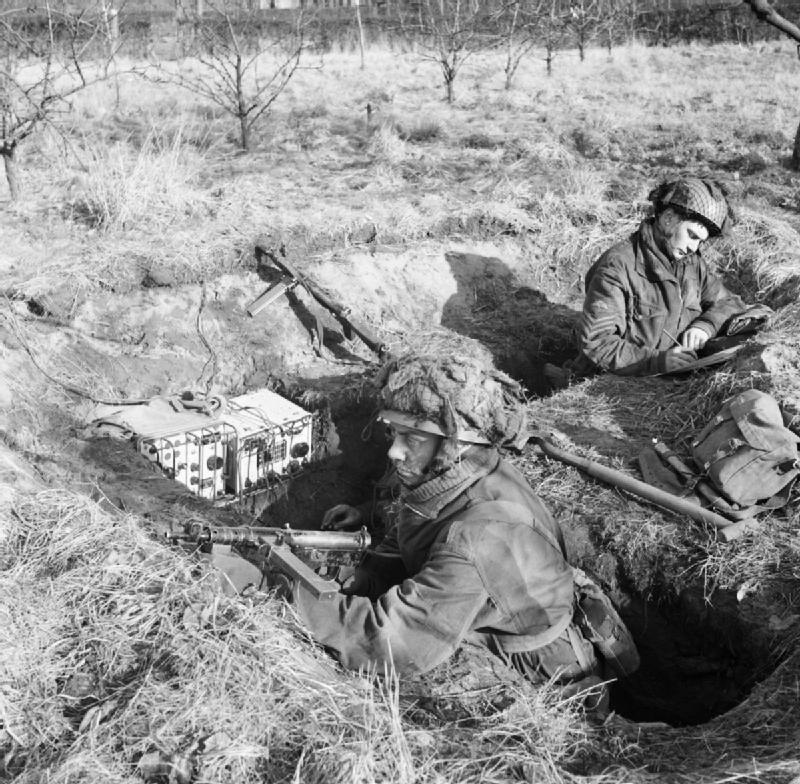
Two airborne soldiers man their wireless trench in the Netherlands.

In England the brigade went into a period of recruitment and training, concentrating on house-to-house street fighting in the bombed areas of Southampton and Birmingham. The training programme culminated in Exercise Eve, an assault on the River Thames, which was intended to simulate the River Rhine in Germany.

By December the brigade was preparing for Christmas leave, when news of the German offensive in the Ardennes broke. As part of the First Allied Airborne Army, 6th Airborne Division was available as a component of the strategic reserve for the Allied forces in northwest Europe. The other two divisions available in reserve, the American 82nd and 101st Airborne, were already at Rheims in northern France, and the 6th Airborne was sent by sea to Belgium to assist the defence. With 29 German and 33 Allied divisions involved, the Battle of the Bulge was the largest single battle on the Western Front during the war. On Christmas Day the division moved up to take position in front of the spearhead of the German advance; by Boxing Day they had reached their allocated places in the defensive line between Dinant and Namur. The 3rd Parachute Brigade were on the left, 5th Parachute Brigade on the right, and the 6th Airlanding Brigade in reserve. Over the next days the German advance was halted and forced back, until at the end of January 1945, the brigade crossed into the Netherlands. Here the division was made responsible for the area along the River Maas, between Venlo and Roermond. The brigade carried out patrols, on both sides of the river, against their opponents from the German 7th Parachute Division. Near the end of February the division returned to England to prepare for another airborne mission, to cross the River Rhine into Germany.

=== Germany ===
Whereas all other Allied airborne landings had been a surprise for the Germans, the Rhine crossing was expected, and their defences were reinforced in anticipation. The airborne operation was preceded by a two-day round-the-clock bombing mission by the Allied air forces. Then on 23 March, 3,500 artillery guns targeted the German positions. At dusk Operation Plunder, an assault river crossing of the Rhine by the 21st Army Group, began. For their part in Operation Varsity, the 6th Airborne Division was assigned to the American XVIII Airborne Corps alongside the United States 17th Airborne Division.

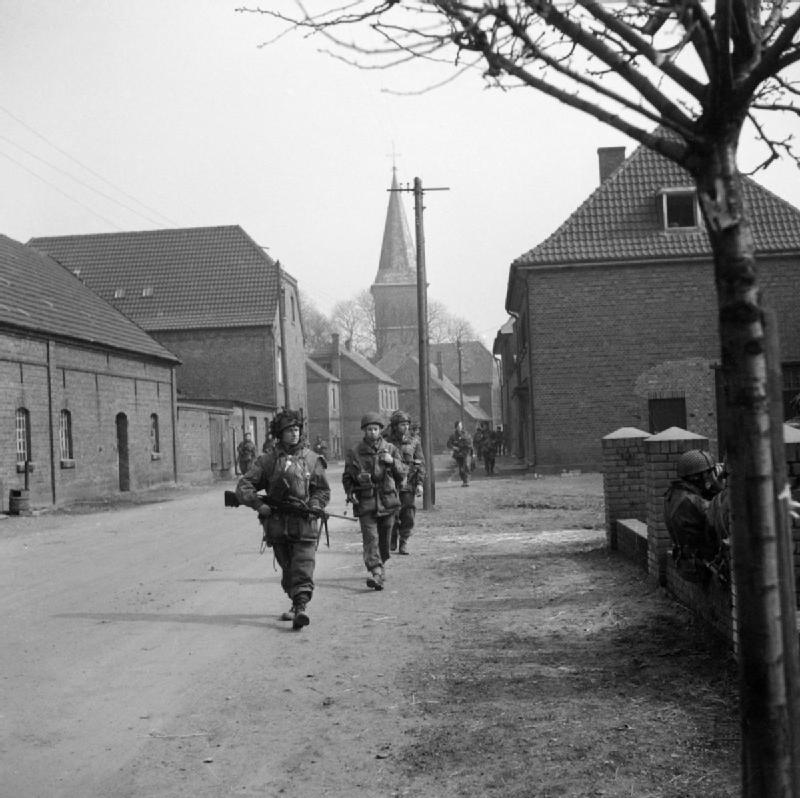
Paratroopers marching through Hamminkeln in Germany, 25 March 1945

In the British sector the 3rd Parachute Brigade would be the first unit to arrive in Germany. Their initial objective was to secure the western edge of the Schneppenberg woods. Brigade headquarters was fully aware of the expected opposition to the landings, and the commander of the 224th (Parachute) Field Ambulance was warned to prepare for around 600 casualties; almost a third of the brigade's manpower. On 24 March 1945 at 07:00 the 122 C-47 Dakotas transporting the brigade took off from England in three waves. The first wave carried brigade headquarters and the 8th Parachute Battalion, the second carried the 1st Canadian Parachute Battalion, and the 9th Parachute Battalion came last. The gliders carrying the brigade's heavy equipment were scheduled to arrive 40 minutes after the third wave. Nine minutes ahead of schedule, the brigade started landing at their DZs. Their premature arrival stopped the Allied artillery and fighter bombers which were engaging targets in the area, especially anti-aircraft gun emplacements. The descending parachutists were met with heavy fire from the German defenders, causing several casualties. One of the dead was the commanding officer of the 1st Canadian Parachute Battalion. It was during the landing that one of the Canadian medics, Corporal Frederick Topham, won a Victoria Cross, becoming the division's only recipient of the award during the war. By 11:00 the 8th Parachute Battalion had secured the DZ, and the other two battalions headed for the Schneppenberg woods, which were secured by 14:00. The 9th Parachute Battalion dug in within the woods, and the 1st Canadian Parachute Battalion on the outskirts. At 15:00 the first troops of the Royal Scots arrived after completing their assault crossing of the Rhine. The day's fighting had cost the brigade 80 dead and 190 wounded, however they had taken around 700 prisoners.

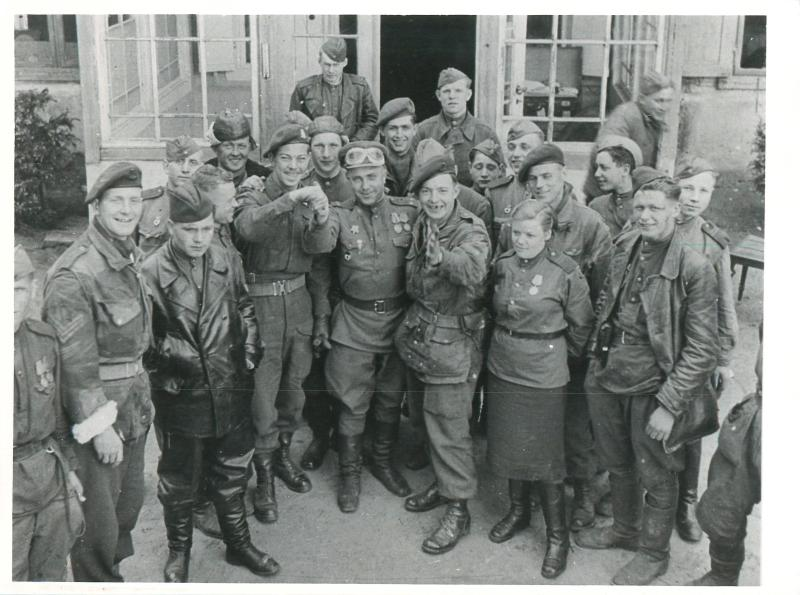
Canadian paratroopers meet Russian soldiers on the east side of Wismar, Germany, May 1945.

On 27 March the division started advancing further into Germany. The 8th Parachute Battalion was the first to reach Lembeck, which was defended by two Panzer Grenadier companies. A hand-to-hand battle ensued, lasting 18 hours and eventually drawing in all three battalions; by midnight the town was secured, with around 300 prisoners taken. The brigade's next objective was Greven and the bridge across the River Ems. At 21:30 the 1st Canadian Parachute Battalion were about 3 miles (4.8 km) away from the town. Leaving what vehicles they had behind, they attempted to approach the bridge unseen on foot, and by 23:00 had successfully secured the town and bridge. The 9th Parachute Battalion was called forward to continue the advance, but just as they approached the bridge it was blown up by the Germans. In the early hours of the morning, a footbridge across the river was discovered, and the 9th Battalion prepared to carry out an assault. 'A' Company crossed the footbridge under fire just before dawn, and after a short fight had secured the crossing. After a few hours' rest the advance continued with the 8th Battalion in the lead, and by nightfall they had reached their next objective, the Dortmund–Ems Canal. Resting overnight, the battalion crossed the half-empty canal at 10:30 the next day. Over the next 36 hours the brigade advanced 70 miles (110 km) to Minden.

The 15th (Scottish) Infantry Division then took over from the 6th Airborne Division as the lead formation until 30 April when the Airborne Division once more resumed the advance, crossing the River Elbe over a bridge captured by the Scottish division. The division's objective was Wismar on the Baltic Sea; the two parachute brigades advanced on separate routes to Gadebusch, aware that the brigade to arrive first would continue as the division's lead formation. By this stage of the war the advance was hampered more by refugees fleeing westwards than by any organised opposition. The 3rd Parachute Brigade won the race and led the division to Wismar, arriving on 1 May only 30 minutes before the lead troops of the Soviet Red Army advancing from the east.

=== Palestine ===
At the end of May 1945, the division was pulled out of Germany and returned to England. It was initially intended to send them to India to form an airborne corps with the 44th Indian Airborne Division. The division's advance party, formed around the 5th Parachute Brigade, had already arrived in India. Following the Japanese surrender, all these plans changed. The post-war British Army only needed one airborne division, and the 6th Airborne was chosen to remain on strength. Reinforced by the 2nd Parachute Brigade, the division was sent to the Middle East as the Imperial Strategic Reserve.

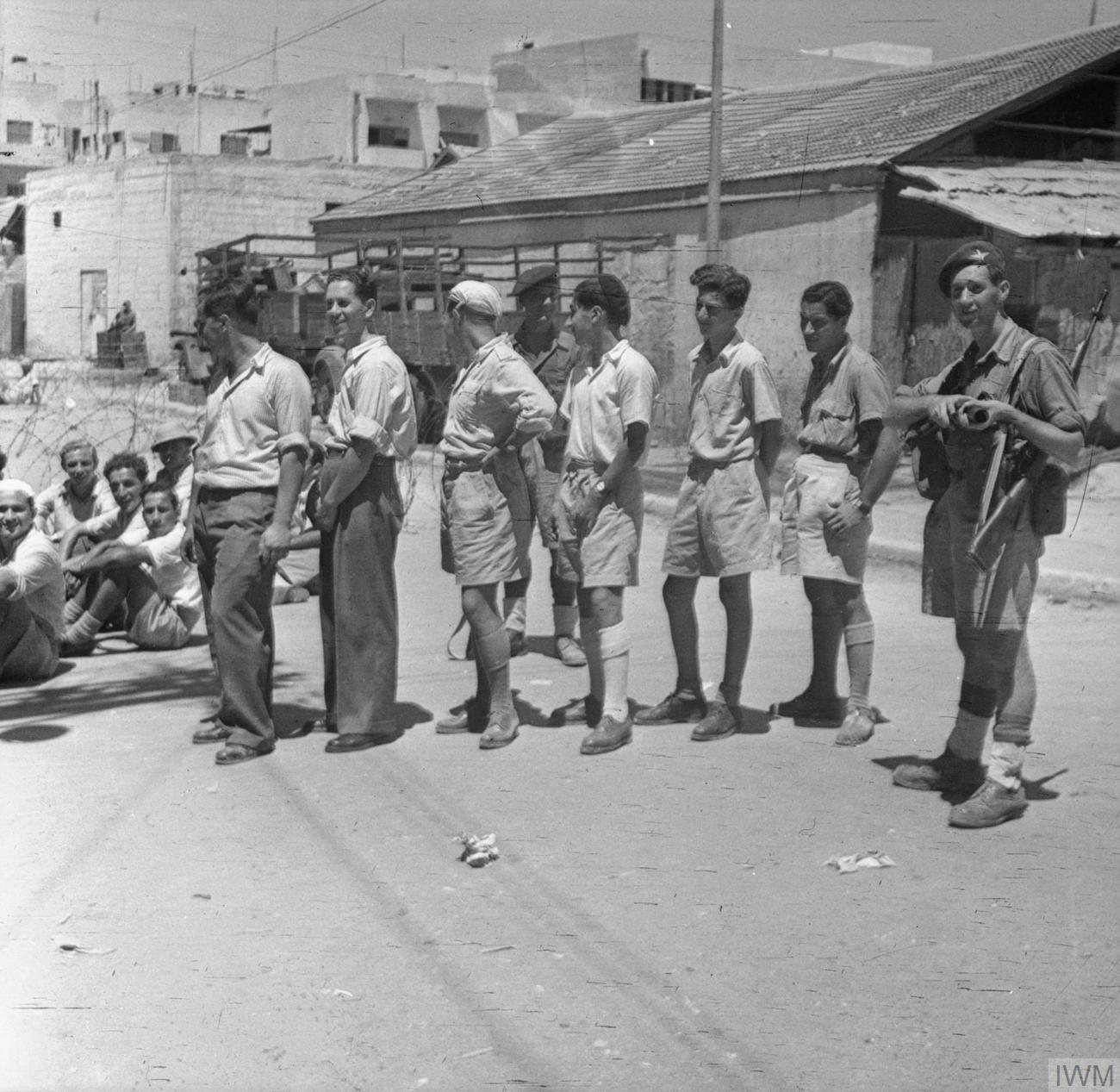
Parachute Regiment soldier standing guard over Jewish civilians waiting to be questioned during Operation Shark, July–August 1946

The 3rd Parachute Brigade was the first unit of the Airborne Division to arrive in Palestine, disembarking at Haifa on 3 October 1945. The brigade then moved to Gaza to acclimatise and regain their fitness after the voyage from England. On 21 October the brigade was deployed around the Lydda district, with responsibility for Tel Aviv and Jaffa. The first incident involving the brigade came on 14 November 1945, when the Jewish National Council called for a 12-hour strike, which resulted in rioting in Tel Aviv. By 18:15 the Palestine Police Force was unable to cope and sent for reinforcements from the 8th Parachute Battalion. The complete battalion was deployed and the riot was under control by 21:40 and a curfew imposed for the rest of the night. Early the following day the curfew was broken by large crowds gathering to loot and burn buildings, so the remainder of the brigade was deployed to the city under the codename Operation Bellicose. Night time curfews remained in place until 05:20 on 20 November, when all troops returned to their barracks. All was quiet in the brigade area until the night of 26/27 December, when police stations in Jaffa and Tel Aviv, the railway at Lydda and an armoury at Tel Aviv were attacked. The brigade again imposed a curfew around Tel Aviv. This was followed by cordon and search operations: Pintail on 29 December, Heron on 8 January, and Pigeon on 30 January.

Over the night of 2/3 April 1946, there were several attacks on railway installations around the country. One at Yibna occurred at the same time as a patrol from the 9th Parachute Battalion was entering the village. The patrol's leading two vehicles exploded mines that had been laid on a bridge, wounding three men. At daylight the tracks of around 30 men were found, and a section from the 8th Parachute Battalion eventually cornered 24 armed men. In the firefight that followed, 14 of them were wounded and the remainder surrendered, with no British casualties. On 29 June Operation Agatha started; the brigade had been rotated to cover the south of Palestine, and were to search for arms and arrest any members of the Palmach in Givat Brenner and No'ar Oved. On 22 July the King David Hotel in Jerusalem was bombed, which was the catalyst for Operation Shark, the searching of every house and property in Tel Aviv. For this operation the brigade had all the divisional artillery and the 3rd The King's Own Hussars under their command. The brigade's next tasks were Operations Bream and Eel between 28 August and 4 September, which entailed the search of Dorot and Ruhama in the Negev. For the first time army dogs trained in metal detecting were used during the operations, and they located a large arms cache in both settlements.

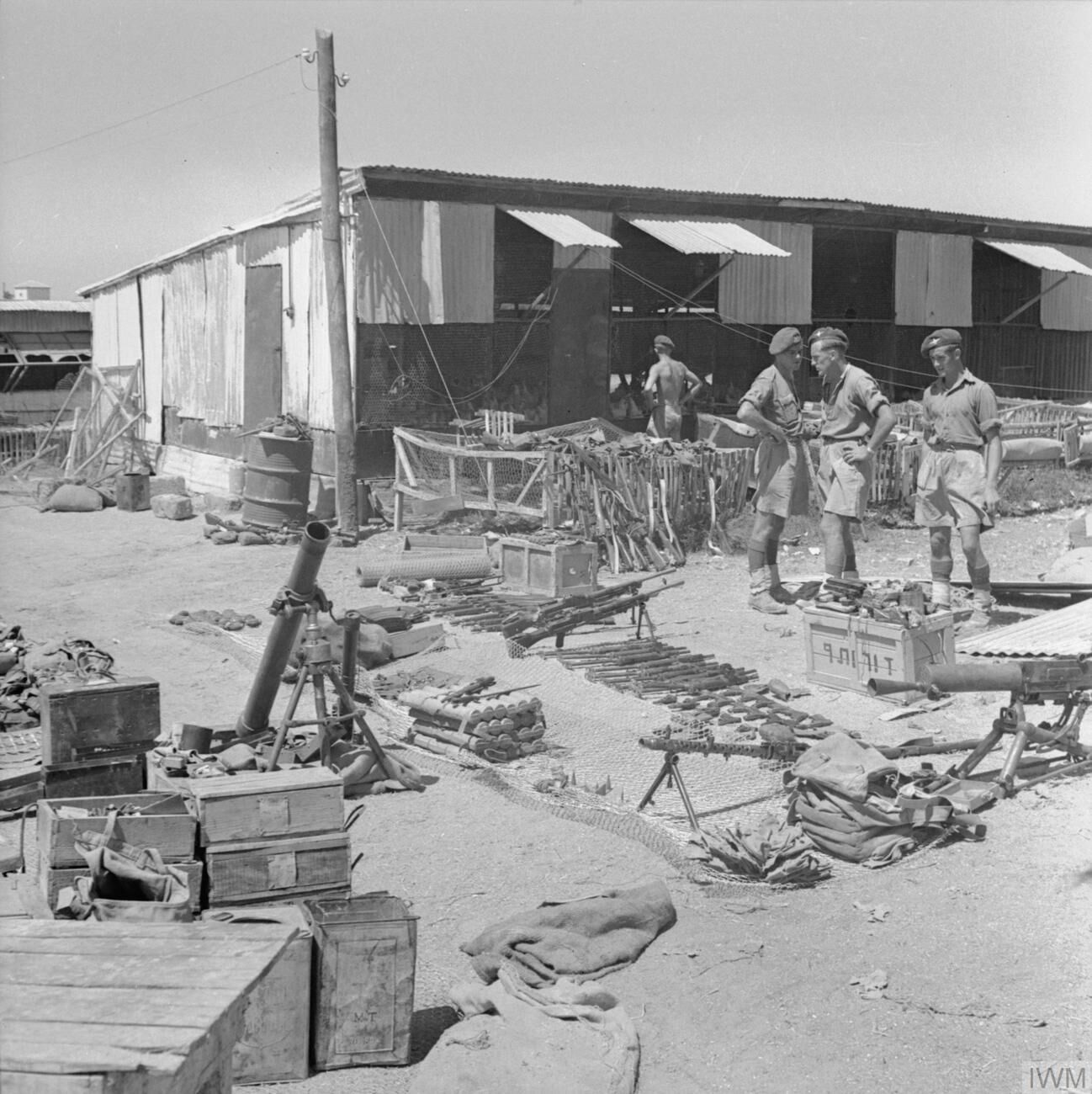
Arms and ammunition found during Operation Bream, a search of a Jewish settlement

In January 1947, the 6th Airborne Division was moved to northern Palestine, swapping locations with the 1st Infantry Division. The 3rd Parachute Brigade took over responsibility for Haifa, which was considered a problem area. The brigade had to guard the docks and port of Haifa, which were the main entry point for immigrants arriving in the country. In addition, the many oil pipelines and installations in the region were a potential target for sabotage. The brigade's first operation was imposing a curfew on the Jewish quarter after the kidnapping of two Britons in retaliation for the death sentence imposed on Dov Gruner. The next major operation was in July, when an indefinite night time curfew was imposed, in response to several attacks in and around the city. The curfew lasted until the end of the month.

In October 1947, the War Office announced its intention to reduce the division's strength by one brigade. The 3rd Parachute Brigade, being more recently established than the other units, was selected to be disbanded. However, instead of disbanding its battalions, it was decided to amalgamate them. The 3rd Parachute Battalion joined with the 2nd Parachute Battalion and was renumbered the 2nd/3rd Parachute Battalion, and the brigade's other two battalions were amalgamated to become the 8th/9th Parachute Battalion. Both of these new units would serve in the 1st Parachute Brigade. The amalgamation of the 2nd and 3rd Parachute Battalions was completed in December, and the 8th and 9th Parachute Battalions in early January. Finally, the brigade headquarters was disbanded at the end of January. During their service in Palestine, nine men from the brigade had been killed.

== Order of battle ==
Commanding officers

- Brigadier Sir Alexander Stanier, 2nd Baronet
- Brigadier Gerald Lathbury
- Brigadier James Hill
- Brigadier Francis Rome

Units

- 7th (Light Infantry) Parachute Battalion
- 8th (Midlands) Parachute Battalion
- 9th (Eastern and Home Counties) Parachute Battalion
- 1st Canadian Parachute Battalion
- 3rd Parachute Battalion
- 224th (Parachute) Field Ambulance–Royal Army Medical Corps
- 3rd Airlanding Anti-Tank Battery–Royal Artillery
- 3rd Parachute Squadron–Royal Engineers

== Notes ==
Footnotes

Citations
