= 8th (Midlands) Parachute Battalion =

- Cap badge of the Parachute Regiment
- Active: 1942–1947
- Country: United Kingdom
- Branch: British Army
- Type: Airborne forces
- Role: Parachute infantry
- Size: Battalion
- Part of: 3rd Parachute Brigade
- Nickname: Red Devils
- Mottos: Utrinque Paratus (Latin "Ready for Anything")

Commanders
- Notable commanders: Alastair Pearson DSO**, MC; John Hackett DSO

Insignia
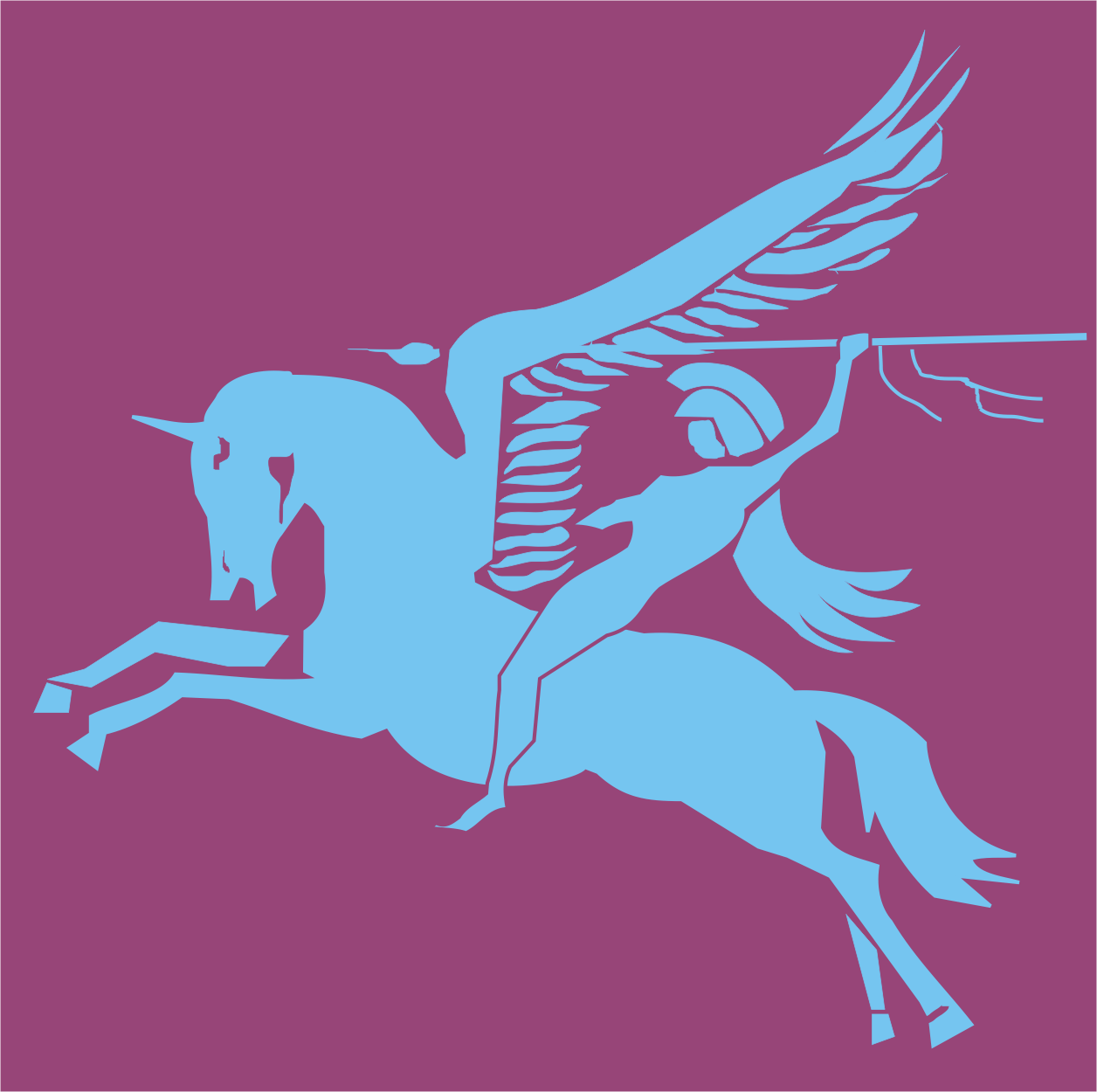
- The emblem of the Second World War British Airborne Forces, Bellerophon riding the flying horse Pegasus

The 8th (Midlands) Parachute Battalion was an airborne infantry battalion of the Parachute Regiment, raised by the British Army during the Second World War. The battalion was created in late 1942 by the conversion of the 13th Battalion, Royal Warwickshire Regiment to parachute duties. The battalion was assigned to the 3rd Parachute Brigade, serving alongside the 7th (later replaced by the 1st Canadian Parachute Battalion) and 9th Parachute battalions, in the 1st Airborne Division before being reassigned to help form the 6th Airborne Division in May 1943.

The 8th Parachute Battalion fought in Operation Tonga, the British airborne landings in France on D-Day, the Normandy Campaign, and the break out to the River Seine. Withdrawn to England in September 1944, the German winter offensive known as the Battle of the Bulge saw the battalion return to the continent. Their final mission during the war was the River Rhine crossing, followed by the advance to the Baltic.

After the war the battalion was sent to Palestine with the 6th Airborne Division until January 1948, when it was amalgamated with the 9th (Eastern and Home Counties) Parachute Battalion (which had served alongside the 8th in 3rd Para Brigade) to form the 8th/9th Parachute Battalion.

== Formation ==
=== Background ===
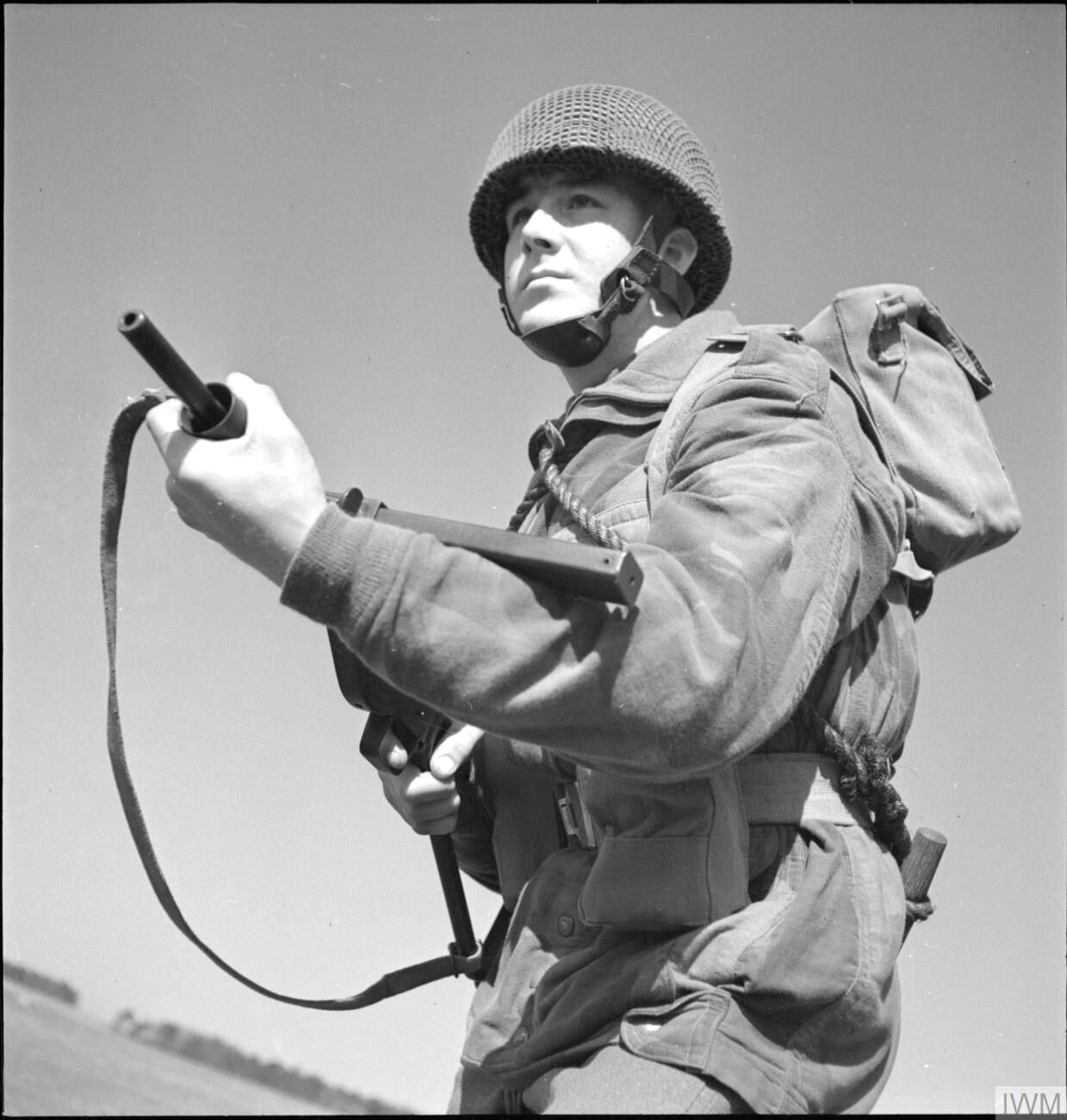
8th Parachute Battalion soldier armed with the Sten submachine gun, he has a toggle rope around his neck and is wearing the airborne forces steel helmet and the Denison smock May 1943.

Impressed by the success of German airborne operations, during the Battle of France, the British prime minister, Winston Churchill, directed the War Office to investigate the possibility of creating a corps of 5,000 parachute troops. On 22 June 1940, No. 2 Commando was turned over to parachute duties and on 21 November, re-designated the 11th Special Air Service Battalion (later 1st Parachute Battalion), with a parachute and glider wing. It was these men who took part in the first British airborne operation, Operation Colossus, on 10 February 1941. The success of the raid prompted the War Office to expand the existing airborne force, setting up the Airborne Forces Depot and Battle School in Derbyshire in April 1942, and creating the Parachute Regiment as well as converting a number of infantry battalions into airborne battalions in August 1942.

=== Battalion ===
The 8th (Midlands) Parachute Battalion was formed in November 1942, by the conversion of the 13th Royal Warwickshire Regiment to parachute duties. (Note: In most conversions, the majority of the original battalion either did not wish to become paratroopers, failed medical or other tests. The spaces in the battalion were filled with volunteers from other units, however every attempt was made to ensure these men came from regiments in the Midlands region of England.) The battalion was assigned to the 3rd Parachute Brigade. Upon formation in 1942, the battalion had an establishment of 556 men in three rifle companies. The companies were divided into a small headquarters and three platoons. The platoons had three Bren machine guns and three 2-inch mortars, one of each per section. The only heavy weapons in the battalion were a 3 inch mortar and a Vickers machine gun platoon. By 1944 a headquarters or support company, was added to the battalion. It comprised five platoons: motor transport, signals, mortar, machine-gun and anti-tank. With eight 3-inch (76 mm) mortars, four Vickers machine guns and ten PIAT anti-tank projectors. The battalion's first commanding officer was Lieutenant Colonel Hildersly, who was succeeded in 1943 by Lieutenant Colonel Alastair Pearson DSO and two bars, MC.

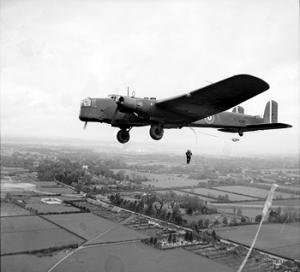
Parachute troops jumping from a Whitley bomber near Windsor England.

All members of the battalion had to undergo a twelve-day parachute training course carried out at No. 1 Parachute Training School, RAF Ringway. Initial parachute jumps were from a converted barrage balloon and finished with five parachute jumps from an aircraft. (Note: Barrage balloons were used to speed up training jumps and meet the target of 5,000 trained parachutists.) Anyone failing to complete a descent was returned to his old unit. Those men who successfully completed the parachute course, were presented with their maroon beret and parachute wings.

Airborne soldiers were expected to fight against superior numbers of the enemy, armed with heavy weapons, including artillery and tanks. So training was designed to encourage a spirit of self-discipline, self-reliance and aggressiveness. Emphasis was given to physical fitness, marksmanship and fieldcraft. A large part of the training regime consisted of assault courses and route marching. Military exercises included capturing and holding airborne bridgeheads, road or rail bridges and coastal fortifications. At the end of most exercises, the battalion would march back to their barracks. An ability to cover long distances at speed was expected: airborne platoons were required to cover a distance of 50 miles (80 km) in 24 hours, and battalions 32 miles (51 km). (Note: This ability was demonstrated in April 1945. When the 3rd Parachute Brigade advanced 15 miles (24 km) in twenty-four hours, which included eighteen hours of close-quarters fighting. In the same month the 5th Parachute Brigade marched 50 miles (80 km) in seventy-two hours, during which they also carried out two night time assaults.)

== Operations ==
=== Normandy ===
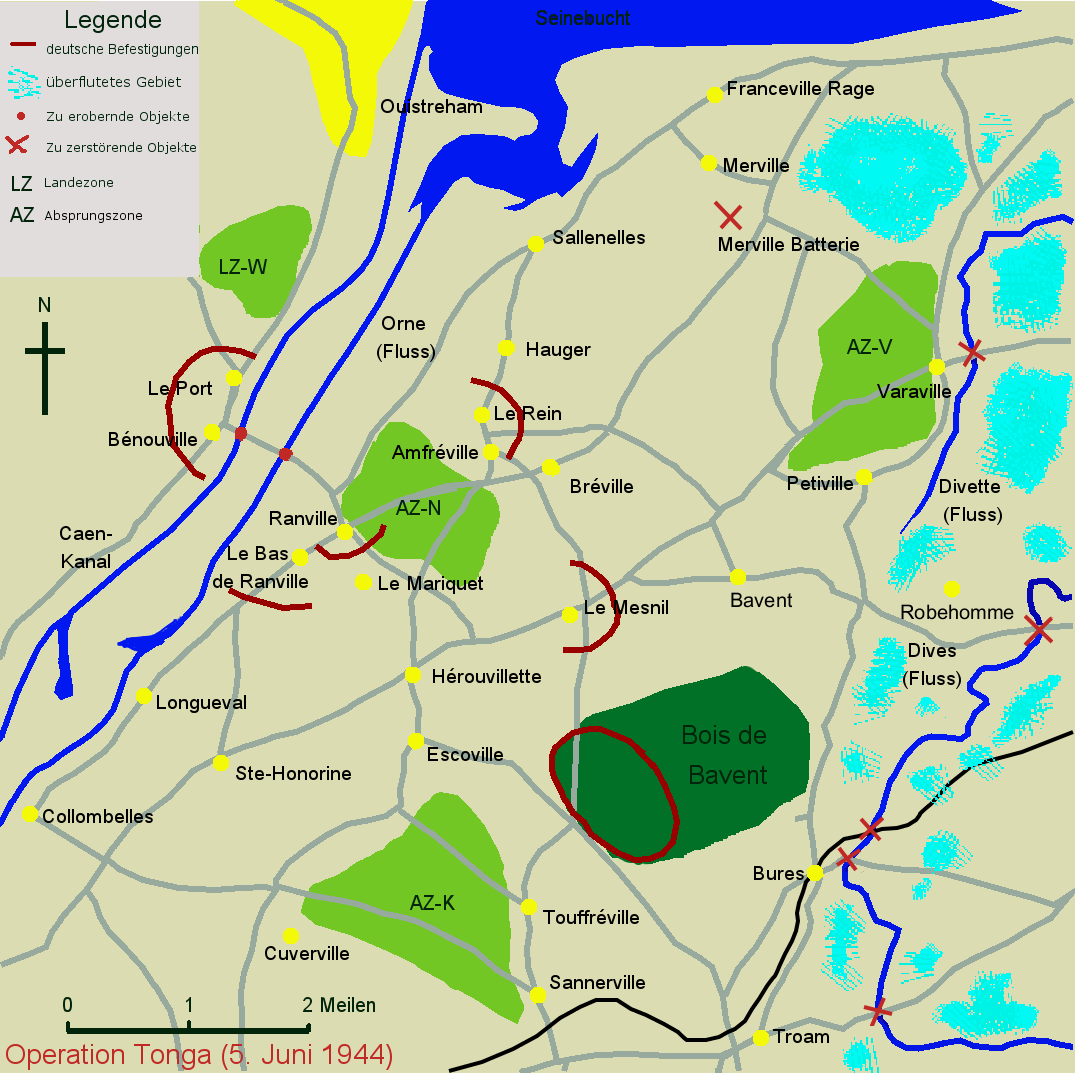
6th Airborne Division, positions June 1944.

On 6 June 1944, the 8th Parachute Battalion landed in Normandy on their own drop zone 'K' between Cuverville and Touffréville 3 miles (4.8 km) to the south of the main force at Ranville. The battalion's objectives were to destroy two bridges crossing the River Dives near Bures and a third at Troarn. The parachute drop was widely scattered, with fourteen of the battalion's thirty-seven Dakota aircraft, releasing their parachutists some distance away, in the operational area of 5th Parachute Brigade. When the commanding officer Lieutenant-colonel Pearson arrived at the battalion rendezvous point (RVP) at 01:20, he found only thirty paratroopers and a small group of engineers with a jeep and trailer who were supposed to demolish the bridges. By 03:30 a further 140 men of the battalion, but no more engineers had arrived at the RVP. Pearson decided to send a small force to demolish the bridges at Bures and lead the rest of the battalion to a crossroad north of Troarn where it would await more reinforcements before it attacked Troarn itself. However, the small force sent to Bures discovered that the two bridges had already been demolished by a group of engineers who had reached the bridges a few hours earlier, and so rejoined the battalion at the crossroads, which by now numbered 150 men. A reconnaissance party was sent into Troarn to ascertain the status of the bridge there, alongside a party of engineers, which came under fire from a house near the bridge. After a brief fire-fight the paratroopers captured a number of Germans from the 21st Panzer Division and then made their way to the bridge, which they discovered had been demolished already. Once the engineers had widened the length of bridge demolished using their explosives, the party retreated back to the battalion at the crossroad. Having achieved its objective, the battalion then moved north and took up positions near Le Mesnil to widen the airborne bridgehead formed by the division. By midnight the battalion was in the Bavent woods. The southernmost point in a 4 miles (6.4 km) defensive line formed by the 3rd Parachute Brigade, stretching northwards from the woods, to Les Mesnil and then Le Plein.

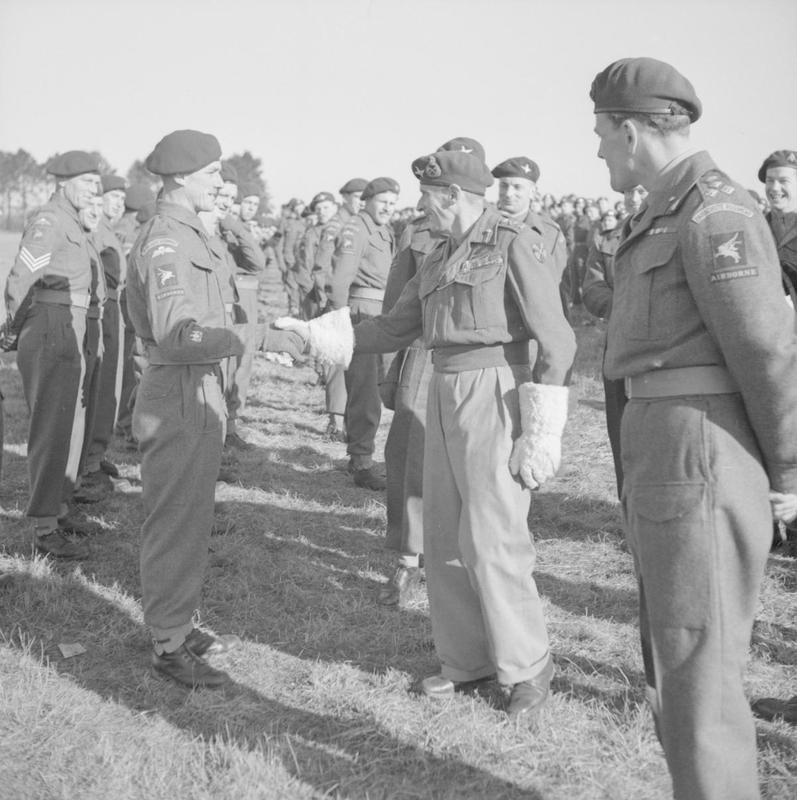
General Sir Bernard Montgomery greets RSM A. Parsons of the 8th (Midlands) Parachute Battalion during an inspection of the 6th Airborne Division at Bulford, Wiltshire, 8 March 1944.

The 8th Battalion's objective was to hold the woods and disrupt German movements in the area. Isolated from the rest of the division, they were assisted in their defence by the dense woods, which broke up infantry assaults and made armoured vehicle attacks impossible. They did however suffer under artillery bombardments, until their trenches had adequate over-head cover. Adopting a policy of mine laying, setting ambushes, raiding and patrolling, at times the battalion's patrols reached as far as Bures and Troarn. The battalion remained in the woods until 16 June, when the 3rd Parachute Brigade went into reserve. When they returned to the front, they continued patrolling and harassing the Germans for the next six weeks. Until 17 August when the 6th Airborne Division, crossed the River Dives. The 8th Battalion were involved in heavy fighting at Goustranville, which they captured by nightfall. By 21 August the battalion, had reached Annebault. Supported by a left flanking attack by the 9th Parachute Battalion, the 8th put in a frontal assault. The village was well defended and both battalions fought all day to liberate the village. The 8th Battalions next major engagement was on 25 August at Beuzeville, attacked by the 3rd Parachute and the 4th Special Service Brigade. Supported by the Cromwell tanks of the 6th Airborne Division Reconnaissance Regiment the battalion gradually overcome the German strong points and captured the town. After the liberation of Beuzeville the 6th Airborne Division having reached Honfleur on the River Seine was ordered to hold their positions. By September the battalion had been withdrawn to England. At the same time Lieutenant Colonel George Hewitson replaced the incapacitated Lieutenant Colonel Pearson as commanding officer.

=== Ardennes ===
On 16 December 1944, the Germans launched a surprise counterattack through the forests of the Ardennes. Their plan was aimed at splitting the Allied armies and pushing through an armoured force to the English Channel. In command on the northern sector Field Marshal Bernard Montgomery ordered the 6th Airborne division, refitting in England to move to Belgium and form a defensive line along the River Meuse. By 29 December, still part of the 3rd Parachute Brigade the 8th Parachute Battalion, were in position to attack the leading German formation, in the Rochefort area. After heavy fighting the town was eventually captured. After the German offensive had been halted the division remained in Belgium and the Netherlands until early 1945.

=== Germany ===
The 8th Parachute Battalion were next in action 24 March 1945, in the biggest and most successful airborne operation of the war. The 6th Airborne Division had the objective of securing a bridgehead across the River Rhine. The battalion was the first unit of the division to land, their objective was to secure drop zone 'A'. The woodland at the edge of the drop zone was secured by 'A' and 'C' Companies with little opposition. However 'B' Company and the Machine Gun Platoon landed in the wrong place and came under fire from defensive positions manned by German parachutists. The position was eventually destroyed in a hand-to-hand battle. With the drop zone secured the rest of the 3rd Parachute Brigade landed and the 8th Battalion became the brigade reserve. They later destroyed two German 88 mm anti-tank guns en route to the brigade equipment dump. By nightfall it was guarding the division headquarters at Kopenhof.

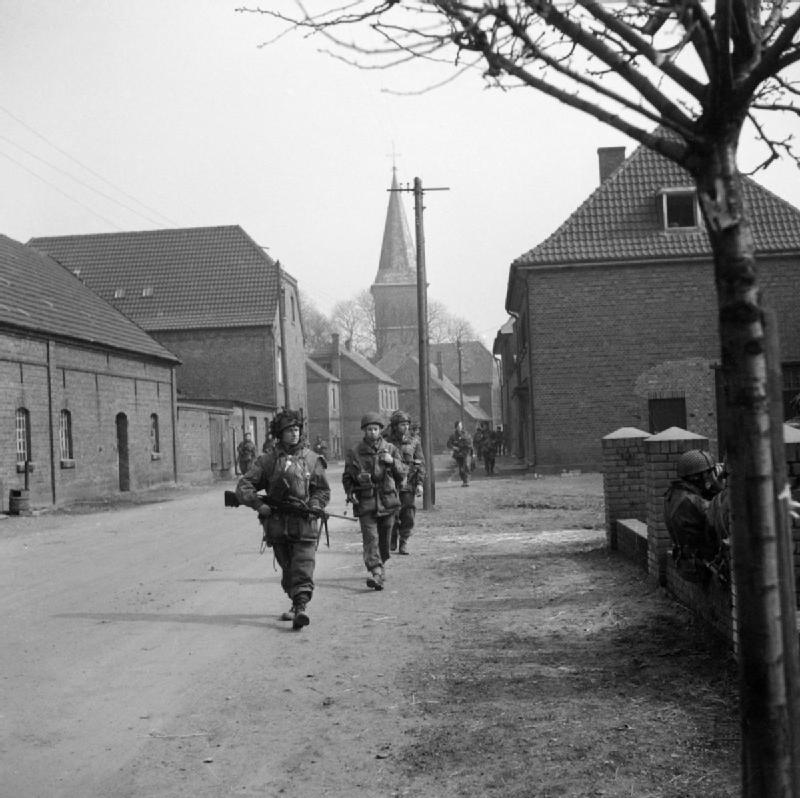
Paratroopers advance through a German town.

The 6th Airborne Division broke out of the Rhine bridgehead on 26 March. The 8th Parachute Battalion supported by the 6th Airborne Reconnaissance Regiment in the lead had by 26 August had reached Lembeck. Putting in a frontal attack the 8th Battalion was stopped by well positioned 20 mm guns. At the same time the 9th Parachute Battalion had secured the left flank and the 1st Canadian Parachute Battalion also became involved in the battle. By the end of the day the battalion had gained a foothold in the town.

The brigade had secured a crossing on the River Ems on 31 March, and the 8th Battalion crossed the river to secure a crossing over the Dortmund-Ems Canal. By the next day two of the Battalions companies had crossed the canal securing a bridgehead on the eastern bank in the face of heavy German artillery barrages. On 4 April, the 8th Battalion were defeated in an attempt to enter Minden. The city was successfully captured that night by using all three battalions of 3rd Parachute Brigade supported by the tanks of the 4th Armoured Battalion, Grenadier Guards part of the 6th Guards Tank Brigade. On 30 April, the 6th Airborne Division was ordered to head for Wismar, on the Baltic Sea which they reached on 2 May. With the war in Europe over, the battalion returned to England at the end of May.

=== Palestine ===
In October 1945, the 6th Airborne Division was sent to the British Mandate of Palestine on internal security duties, the 3rd Parachute Brigade being based in the Lydda district, which included Tel Aviv. On 13 November, the 8th Battalion was sent into Tel Aviv, to deal with riots by the Jewish population, following the publication of a white paper on Palestine. The violence spread and eventually the whole 3rd Parachute Brigade became involved and order was not established until 20 November. The 3rd Parachute Brigade was disbanded in October 1947, and the 8th and 9th Parachute Battalion were amalgamated as the 8th/9th Parachute Battalion. The new battalion was assigned to the 1st Parachute Brigade, however further post war reductions in the British Army saw this battalion disbanded in June 1948.

== Notes ==
Footnotes

Citations
