= Abhinav Kumar Choudhary =

Major (then Captain) Abhinav Kumar Choudhary SC
- Born: Udhampur, Jammu Kashmir, India
- Military career
- Allegiance: India
- Branch: Indian Army
- Service years: 2014–present
- Rank: Major
- Unit: Corps of Signals
- Commands: 21 Rashtriya Rifles
- Awards: Shaurya Chakra

Major Abhinav Kumar Choudhary is an officer in the Indian Army and a recipient of the Shaurya Chakra, India's third-highest peacetime gallantry award. He was awarded for exemplary leadership and bravery during a counter-infiltration operation in Baramulla district, Jammu and Kashmir in August 2018, while serving with the 21 Rashtriya Rifles (Brigade of the Guards) under the command of Colonel Ashutosh Sharma, SM.

== Early life and education ==
Choudhary joined the Indian Army through the Technical Entry Scheme (TES). He was part of the TES-24 course at the Cadets Training Wing of the Military College of Telecommunication Engineering (MCTE), Mhow, Madhya Pradesh. He subsequently trained at the Indian Military Academy (IMA), Dehradun, and was commissioned into the Corps of Signals in December 2014.

== Military career ==
On 24 February 2018, Choudhary was deputed to the 21 Rashtriya Rifles, an infantry battalion engaged in counter-insurgency operations in Jammu and Kashmir.

=== Baramulla Operation (7–8 August 2018) ===
On 7–8 August 2018, based on intelligence inputs about infiltrating terrorists, Captain Choudhary led a team in the Liddar Panzal area of Baramulla district. Despite poor visibility and difficult terrain, he repositioned his troops to cut off escape routes.

During the operation, he personally engaged two militants hiding behind a boulder. He neutralized one with accurate fire and engaged the other in close-quarters combat. He then assisted in the evacuation of an injured comrade. Under his leadership, the operation resulted in the elimination of all five Lashkar-e-Taiba terrorists without any casualties to Indian forces.

== Shaurya Chakra ==
Captain Choudhary was awarded the Shaurya Chakra for his role in the Baramulla operation. The official citation recognized his "exceptional courage, presence of mind and leadership," stating his actions prevented the terrorists from infiltrating populated areas.

== See also ==
- Shaurya Chakra
- Ashutosh Sharma (colonel)
- Indian Army
