= Ashutosh Sharma =

Ashutosh Sharma may refer to:

- Ashutosh Sharma (colonel), Indian Army officer killed in action in 2020
- Ashutosh Sharma (chemical engineer), professor at the Indian Institute of Technology Kanpur
- Ashutosh Sharma (cricketer), Indian cricketer
