= 6th Airborne Division in Palestine =

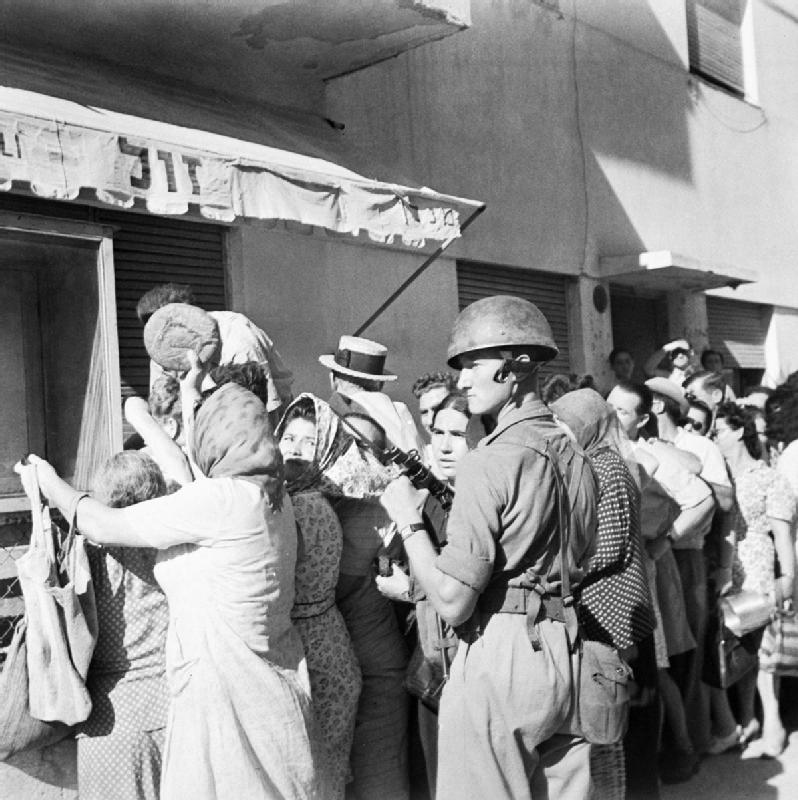
A soldier of the British 6th Airborne Division maintains order outside a baker's shop in Tel Aviv.

The 6th Airborne Division in Palestine was initially posted to the region as the Imperial Strategic Reserve. It was envisioned as a mobile peace keeping force, positioned to be able to respond quickly to any area of the British Empire. In fact the division became involved in an internal security role between 1945 and 1948.

Palestine had been under British Mandatory rule following the end of World War I and the dissolution of the Ottoman Empire. Under the terms of the mandate, Great Britain was responsible for the government and security of the country. Since the Balfour Declaration in 1917, "the establishment in Palestine of a national home for the Jewish people" had been a stated British aim and between 1922 and 1939 over 250,000 Jewish immigrants had arrived in the territory. However, Arab resistance and World War II prompted the British to curtail immigration. The time also saw the rise of the Jewish Resistance Movement, which eventually came into conflict with the British authorities.

When the British 6th Airborne Division arrived in response to increasing terrorist activity, it became involved in internal security, being responsible for cordons and search operations, guarding convoys and key installations. As the situation worsened, the men of the division had to patrol the towns and cities, enforce curfews and deal with rioting by the civilian population. They also protected Jewish and Arab settlements from sectarian violence. This was not without loss to the division and several members were killed and wounded during this time.

The end of the British mandate coincided with the post war reduction of the British Army back to peace time levels, and the division's numbers were gradually reduced. By the end of their tenure in Palestine, the division's strength was reduced in real terms, to less than brigade size. In 1948 it was disbanded soon after its withdrawal from Palestine.

== Background ==
In July 1922, the British Mandate of Palestine was created. Under the terms of the mandate, Great Britain was responsible for the government and defence of the country and for the establishment of a Jewish homeland. Then in September 1922, the League of Nations and Great Britain decided that any Jewish homeland would not be formed in the land to the east of the River Jordan. This instead became a separate country known as the Hashemite Kingdom of Jordan.

Encouraged by the British, 265,000 Jewish immigrants, mainly from Europe, came to settle in Palestine between 1919 and 1939. Arab resistance and violence to this influx of immigrants came to a head in 1937, and the Peel Commission recommended that two states should be formed, one Arab and one Jewish, which would divide the country between them. Then in May 1939, the British restricted the number of Jewish immigrants to 75,000 in the White Paper of 1939.

By the end of 1945, Jewish immigration had almost reached the 75,000 White Paper limit. Arab concerns led to the British putting further restrictions on immigration. Even when the scale of the Holocaust became known, the British stance remained the same. This led to an inevitable confrontation between the British authorities, illegal Jewish immigrants, and militant Zionist groups. It became a widespread belief within the Jewish community that the British were practising antisemitism and were no different from Nazi Germany. However, between 1945 and 1948 a further 85,000 Jewish immigrants, mostly survivors of the Holocaust, entered the country illegally.

=== Jewish resistance movements ===
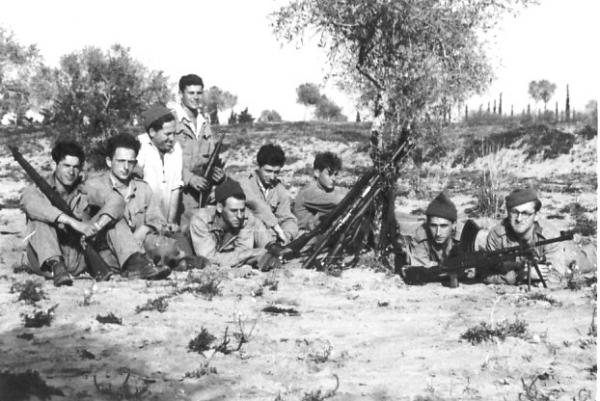
Haganah unit circa 1942–1947 armed with an assortment of British weapons

During this time the Jewish Resistance Movement was formed, comprising several pre-existing Jewish groups. In 1921, the part-time Haganah was formed and trained as a national army. Most Jewish males and some females were required to join. After the Second World War, it obtained numerous surplus weapons to equip its members. The Haganah gave priority to increasing the Jewish population by bringing immigrants into the country from Europe. It always attempted to give prior notice of an attack so that any security service personnel in the area could be evacuated.

When Axis forces posed a threat to the Middle East in the Second World War, the Haganah organized a full-time, elite force, the Palmach. By 1947, this organization numbered around 2,200 members. Palmach members were subject to military discipline; many of them had served in the British forces during the war. (Note: Around 26,000 Palestinian Jews served in the British forces during the Second World War.)

In 1937, a splinter group was formed by those not happy with the Haganah methods. This group was called the National Military Organization in the Land of Israel or Irgun in short. It launched a campaign of violence against the government in 1944, carrying out several terrorist attacks. By 1945, Irgun had an estimated membership of 1,500. A third group was the Lehi, the Hebrew acronym of "Fighters for the Freedom of Israel", known in the British press as the Stern Gang. Lehi membership consisted of only around fifty men. It was the only Jewish group that contemplated working with the Italians and Germans during the war, and afterwards assassinated members of the British authorities. By 1946, both the Irgun and Lehi had declared war on Great Britain.

=== British 6th Airborne Division ===
Despite its name, the 6th Airborne Division was one of only two airborne divisions raised by the British Army during the Second World War. Before being deployed to Palestine, the division had served only in Europe. It had participated in the Normandy landings in June 1944 and later the Battle of the Bulge in December. After the Rhine crossing in March 1945, it spent six weeks advancing across Germany to the Baltic Sea.

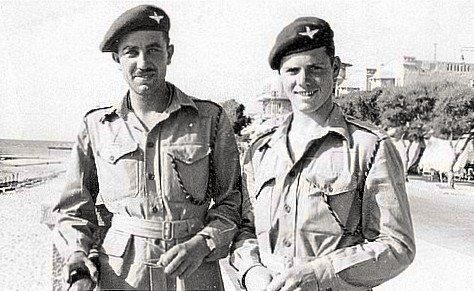
Men of the Parachute Regiment in Palestine.

At the end of the war in Europe, it had been planned to send the division to Burma to form an airborne corps with the 44th Indian Airborne Division. However, the atomic bombings of Hiroshima and Nagasaki, and the Japanese surrender, ended the war and changed British plans. The 6th Airborne Division was nominated to be the Imperial Strategic Reserve. Together with a Royal Air Force troop-carrier formation, they were to be located in the Middle East as a quick reaction peace keeping force for the British Empire. Initially No. 283 Wing RAF had two squadrons of transport aircraft, 620 and 644, available to provide troop transport.

By September 1945, the division was en route to the region for airborne training. However, conditions in Palestine were deteriorating. By the time the division arrived, instead of training, it was deployed on internal security.

During the Second World War, the division comprised the 3rd Parachute Brigade and 5th Parachute Brigade, both consisting of parachute infantry, and the 6th Airlanding Brigade, composed of glider infantry. However the 5th Parachute Brigade had been sent to] India ahead of the rest of the division. So when the division was dispatched to the Middle East, the 2nd Parachute Brigade was assigned to bring them up to strength. In May 1946, after the 1st Airborne Division was disbanded, the 1st Parachute Brigade joined the division, replacing the 6th Airlanding Brigade. In August 1946, the 5th Parachute Brigade returned from the Far East, and joined the division, but was disbanded soon afterwards. The next major manpower development came in 1947, when the 3rd Parachute Brigade was disbanded and the 2nd Parachute Brigade, while remaining part of the division, was withdrawn to England, then sent to Germany.

== Operations ==
=== 1945 ===
Still commanded by its last wartime commander, Major General Eric Bols, the division began deployment to Palestine in 1945. The advance party arrived on 15 September, followed by the Tactical Headquarters on 24 September, then the 3rd Parachute Brigade on 3 October, the 6th Airlanding Brigade on 10 October and the 2nd Parachute Brigade on 22 October. After arriving by sea at Haifa, the newly arrived troops were sent to camps in the Gaza Subdistrict to acclimatize to the conditions, and to regain their fitness after the long sea journey from England. By the end of the month divisional headquarters was established at Bir Salim. The 2nd Parachute Brigade at remained at Gaza, the 3rd Parachute Brigade moved to the Tel Aviv and Jaffa region, while the 6th Airlanding Brigade moved to Samaria.

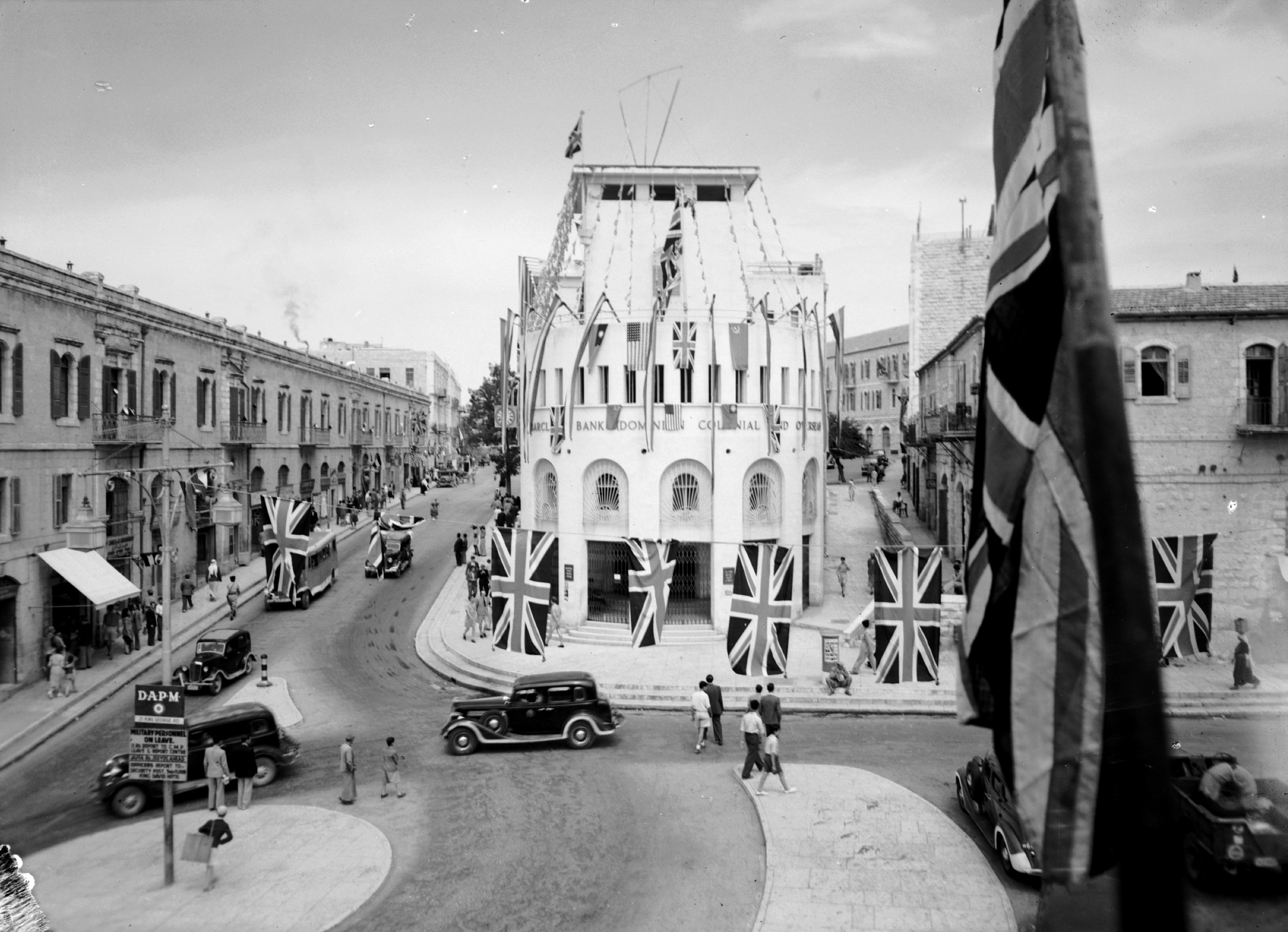
Jerusalem on VE Day (8 May 1945)

It was not long before the division became involved in operations, enforcing a night time curfew at the end of October after the railway in the divisional area was sabotaged. On 13 November the British Government confirmed they would examine the conditions of Jews in Europe and consult the Arabs to ensure Jewish immigration, at the time around 1,500 persons a month, was not hindered.

Unhappy that the announcement did not go far enough, the Jewish National Council arranged a twelve-hour strike for the next day. Rioting started in Tel Aviv and the Jewish part of Jerusalem, which resulted in the 3rd Parachute Brigade being deployed to patrol the streets for the following five days.

The first operation involving the 6th Airlanding Brigade followed two attacks by the Palmach on coastguard stations over the night of 24/25 November. Palestine Police Force dogs tracked the attackers to the settlements of Rishpon and Sidna Ali. In the following cordon and search operation, the police were stoned by the inhabitants, and the soldiers on the cordon had to prevent reinforcements from other settlements reaching the villages. The next day, 26 November, the police were involved in hand-to-hand fighting with the villagers and eventually withdrew, calling on the brigade to enter the settlements and enforce law and order. Leaving some men behind on the cordon to hold back the estimated 3,000 crowd, the remainder of the brigade entered the settlements. Here they carried out several baton charges and for the first time used tear gas to disperse the crowds. In the cleanup operation, 900 persons were later arrested.

Near the end of the year, over the night of 26/27 December, several attacks were carried out by the Irgun on police stations, Palestine Railways installations and one British Army armoury. The 3rd Parachute Brigade again enforced a night time curfew on Tel Aviv. Then on 29 December, it took part in Operation Pintail, the search of Ramat Gan, for Irgun members involved in the attacks. The brigade questioned the 1,500 inhabitants, arresting eighty-nine.

=== 1946 ===
The first mission of 1946 was Operation Hebron on 8 January. This time the objective was the cordon and search of the town of Rishon LeZion by the 3rd Parachute Brigade and the police, during which fifty-five suspects were taken into custody. For the rest of the month, the brigade was involved in several smaller operations. In Operation Pigeon on 30 January, they searched the Shapira district of Tel Aviv.

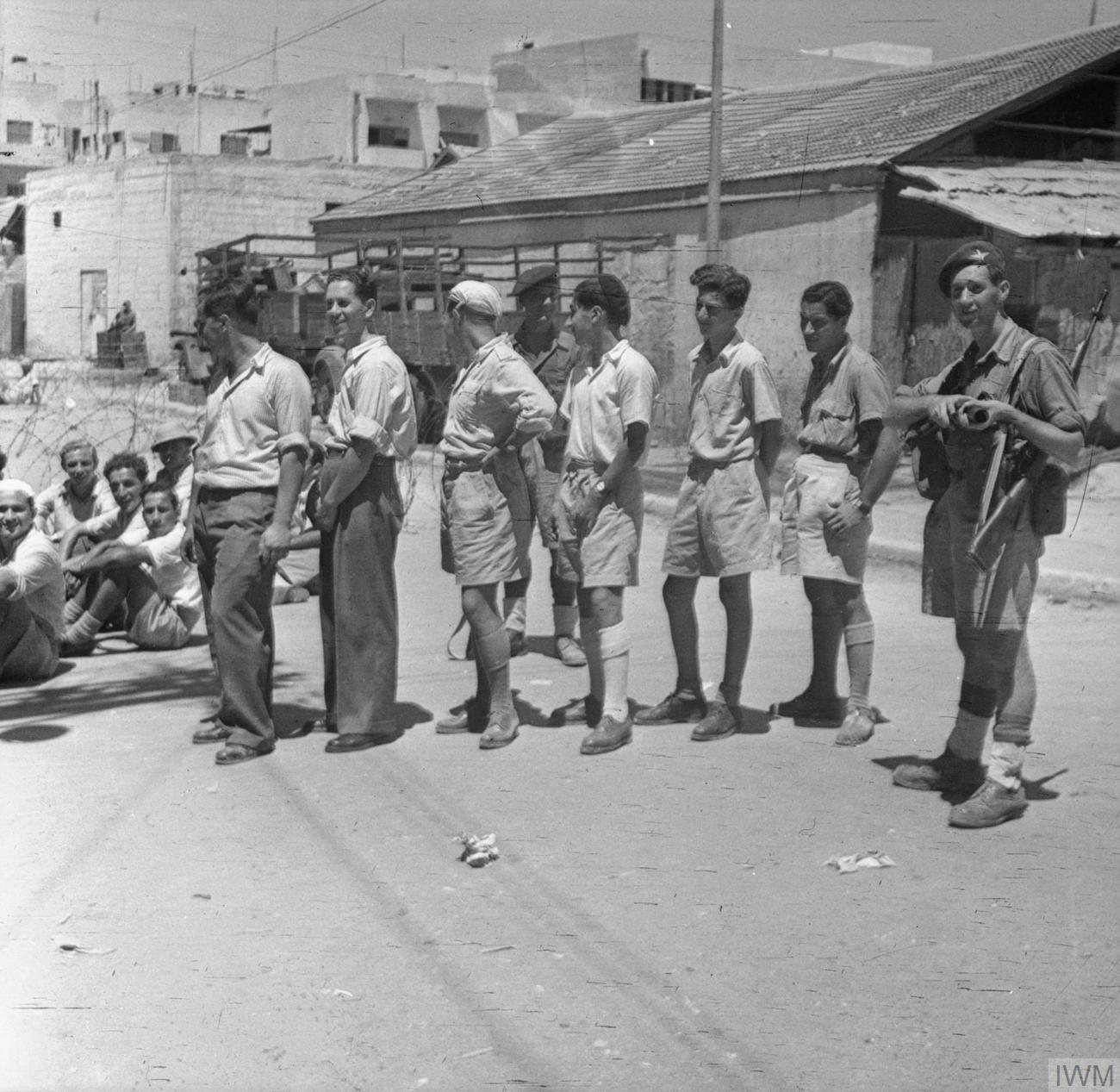
Tel Aviv 1946, Jewish civilians waiting to be interviewed by police and army officers, guarded by a soldier from the Parachute Regiment.

On 5 March Major General James Cassels took over command of the division. The next action involving the division was over the night of 2/3 April, when units of the Irgun attacked railway installations in the divisional area. While one attack on the Yibna railway station and police post was in progress, a mobile patrol from the 9th Parachute Battalion arrived, detonating a mine while crossing a bridge. Three of the patrol were wounded, but the others took off after the saboteurs. Reinforcements arrived from the 5th and 6th Parachute Battalions. In the morning, tracks of around thirty men were discovered leading away from the area. A spotter plane later located the men and directed a section of the 8th Parachute Battalion to intercept them. After a small battle, fourteen of the saboteurs were wounded and twenty-six prisoners taken.

In March the 1st Parachute Brigade joined the division. The 6th Airlanding Brigade left the division on 13 April, but remained in Palestine as the 31st Independent Infantry Brigade. This reduced the division's manpower by around twenty-five per cent as the strength of the airlanding brigade had been almost equal to that of two parachute brigades combined.

At 20:45 on 25 April, the Lehi carried out an attack on a divisional car park in Tel Aviv. On that night, the car park was guarded by ten men from the 5th Parachute Battalion. The attackers, around thirty men, established a fire base in a house overlooking the car park. The attack began with a bomb thrown into a guard tent. Gunfire was directed at all of the soldiers in the area, then twenty of the attackers stormed the car park. Once inside the compound, they entered the guard tents, killing four unarmed soldiers and looting the rifle racks of weapons. Another two off-duty soldiers, responding to the attack, were killed approaching the car park. In total, seven men from the division were killed.

This was the first deliberate attack by any group targeting the British Army, which had not established defences against any form of assault. During the following day seventy suspects were rounded up, but no evidence of their involvement could be found. In response to the attack, the British imposed a road curfew from 18:00 to 06:00 each night and all cafes, restaurants and public entertainment venues in Tel Aviv were closed between 20:00 and 05:00. However this was not enough for some members of the division, who attacked Jewish houses in Qastina and Be'er Tuvia, injuring some of the occupants. Those involved were later punished by the British Army.

Attacks on the security services had increased to a level that on 19 June all ranks were ordered to be armed at all times on or off duty, and to travel in pairs during the day and in threes at night. Near the end of June the division received orders for Operation Agatha, the arrest of Jewish leaders "suspected of condoning" or being involved in sabotage or murder of civil and military personnel. Agatha was a nationwide operation involving not only the 6th Airborne Division but the Palestinian Police Force and all other army units in the country. Secondary objectives were to gather intelligence and arrest any members of the Palmach that could be found.

Operation Agatha started at 04:15 on 29 June. The 2nd Parachute Brigade was responsible for Tel Aviv, the 1st Parachute Brigade for Jewish settlements around Ma'abarot and the 3rd Parachute Brigade for those around Givat Brenner. The operation ended on 1 July after 2,718 suspects had been arrested. Many had no connection to the resistance movements and were instead arrested for harassing the searchers or for refusing to give their names when asked. The 6th Airborne Division alone arrested 636 persons, 135 of them for being suspected Palmach members and ten were Jewish leaders.

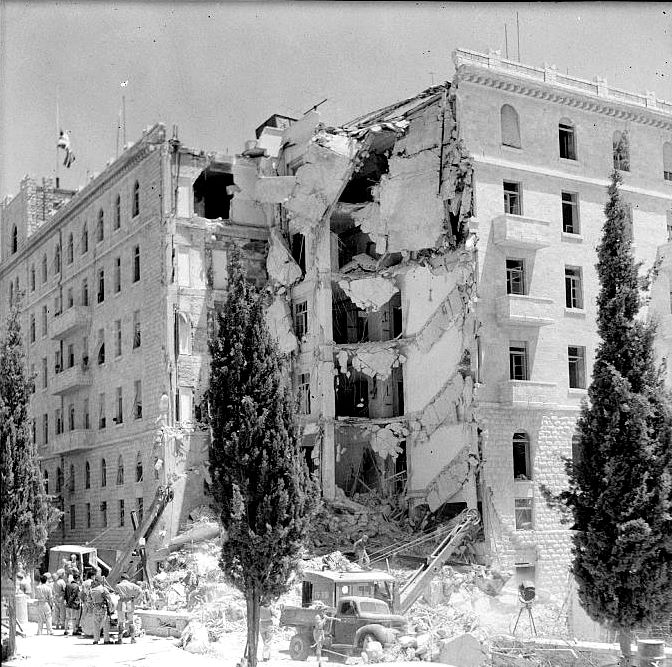
The King David Hotel after the attack

The next major incident was on 22 July, when the British administrative and military headquarters located in the King David Hotel were bombed. No members of the division were directly involved, but the Royal Engineers of the 9th Airborne Squadron were called in to take charge of the search for survivors and secure the part of the building left standing. Over the next three days they located six survivors and the bodies of ninety-one victims. To assist in the search for those responsible, the 8th and 9th Parachute Battalions moved into Jerusalem on 23 July.

The British response to the bombing came on 30 July, when the division carried out Operation Shark. Believing that the bombers were being sheltered in Tel Aviv, every dwelling and building was searched for members of the Lehi and Irgun, and the population questioned. During the operation, a cordon surrounded the city and a curfew was imposed on its inhabitants. To allow the population to buy food and other essentials, the curfew was lifted for two hours every second day, until the end of the operation. The division's three parachute brigades were each given one quarter of the city to cordon and search while the fourth quarter was the responsibility of the 2nd Infantry Brigade, attached to the division for the operation. Over four days each brigade questioned around 100,000 people, and 787 were detained for further questioning. During the searches, five arms dumps were found, containing four machine guns, twenty-three mortars, 176 rifles and pistols, and 127,000 round of ammunition. Also found were £50,000 of forged bearer bonds, forging equipment and a large amount of explosives.

The division's next operations were Bream and Eel, searching for arms in Dorot and Ruhama, by the 3rd and 8th Parachute Battalions, and the 9th Airborne Squadron Royal Engineers. The two villages were cordoned at dawn on 28 August. Over the next six days the settlements were searched, during which a large quantity of assorted weapons, including heavy machine guns and mortars, were found.

Over the remaining months of the year the division carried out patrols of the rail and road networks, which were being mined. Some of the mines killed men from the division attempting to disarm them, until orders were issued to blow the mines up rather than disarm them. Then on 2 December a road mine killed four men from the 2nd Forward Observation Unit (Airborne).

A change in command occurred on 13 December when Major General Cassels left the division and was replaced by Eric Bols, now commanding the division for the second time.

=== 1947 ===
Between 29 December 1946 and 3 January the division's brigades carried out seven search operations in Tel Aviv, arresting 191 people. On 2 January several attacks were made on roads in the division's area. One attack wounded eight men of the 4th and 5th Parachute Battalions. Another attack on the same day was carried out by the Lehi against the 1st Parachute Battalion headquarters in Tel Aviv, killing a Jewish policeman and wounding two soldiers and another police officer. Then on 18 January the 6th Airborne and 1st Infantry Division swapped locations, the airborne division now assuming responsibility for the north of the country. Although it remained part of the division, the 2nd Parachute Brigade was withdrawn to England on 24 January.

Upon their arrival in the north, the 1st Parachute Brigade assumed responsibility for the District of Galilee, and the 3rd Parachute Brigade for the District of Haifa, with division headquarters located in the Stella Maris Monastery. The 1st Parachute Brigade also took under its command the Transjordan Frontier Force and a battalion of the Arab Legion to cover their large area. In the north the division was mainly responsible for the security of the port of Haifa, the largest in the country, where they protected oil installations, the Kirkuk–Haifa oil pipeline and prevented illegal immigrants from landing on the coastline. (Note: The companies in the area were Consolidated Refineries Limited (CRL), a joint venture of Shell and the Anglo-American Oil Company (now Esso) and the Iraq Petroleum Company.) On 31 January it was announced that all non-essential British civilians were to be evacuated, due to the worsening situation. The evacuation took place from Haifa between 5 and 8 February, under the control of the 8th Parachute Battalion and the Royal Navy.

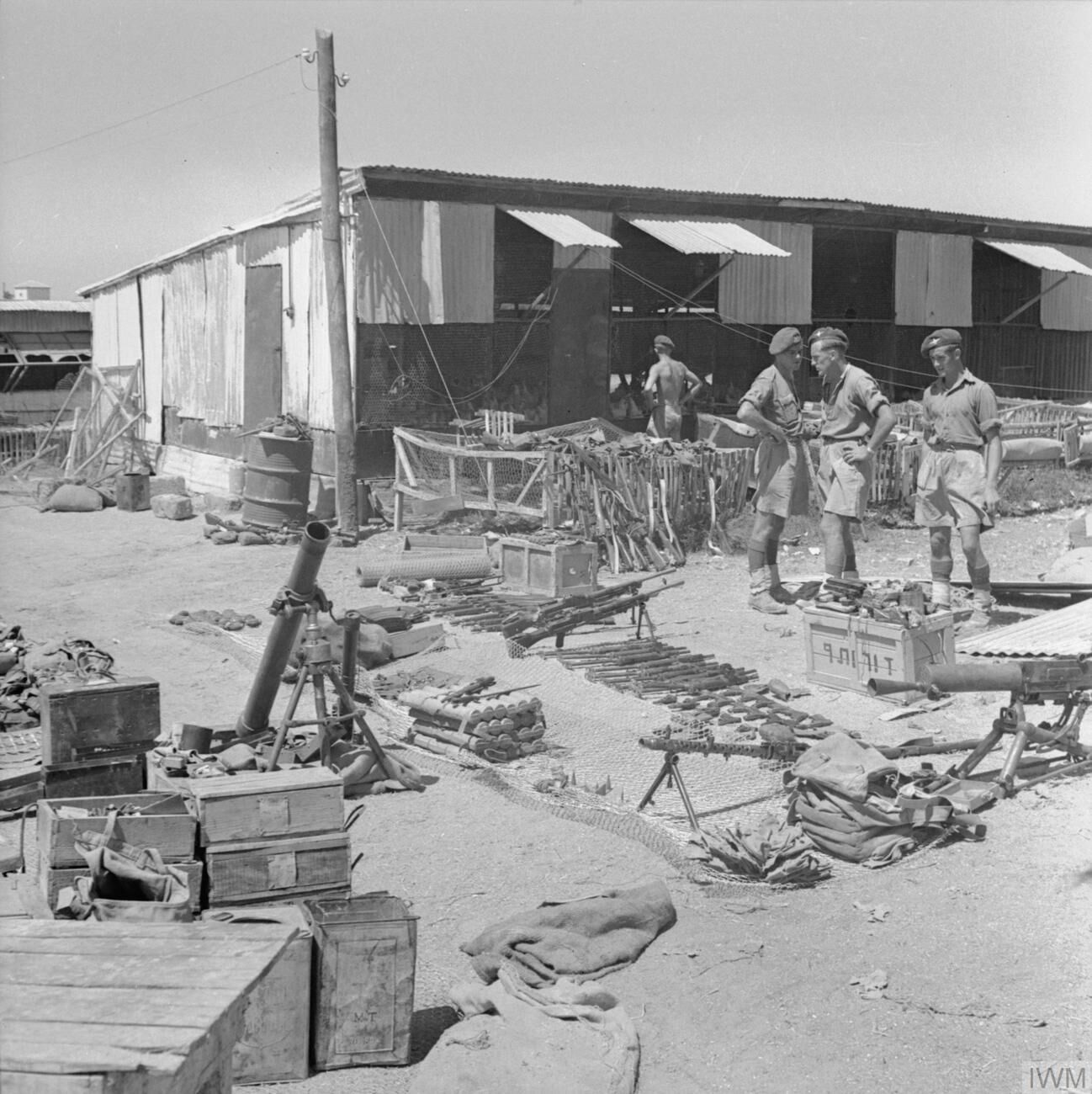
Men of the 6th Airborne Division look at the assorted weapons, ammunitions and equipment discovered in the Jewish settlement of Doroth near Gaza.

On 4 May a group of around forty men carried out the Acre Prison break, releasing forty-one Jews and 214 Arabs. At the same time a mortar attack was carried out on the 2nd Parachute Battalion's camp, as a diversion. The first unit to reach the prison was a platoon from the 1st Parachute Battalion, 35 minutes later. Other men from the battalion and some divisional units were bathing in the sea a short distance from the prison. A truck load of escaping prisoners opened fire on one unit's armoured car. The escaping truck then reached an improvised road block set up by some bathers and crashed under fire. The division's bathing party killed four attackers, four Jewish and one Arab escapee, and recaptured thirteen Jews. The bathers had eight men wounded during the short battle. While this was going on, the 1st Parachute Brigade was establishing a cordon around Acre and the surrounding area but no further escapees were caught.

The next attack was on officers from the 9th Parachute Battalion on 28 June. The officers were dining at a restaurant when two men of the Irgun approached and fired machine guns through the windows. One officer was killed outright while several others were wounded. The officers returned fire and the car the gunmen were escaping in crashed; later examination revealed at least one of them had been wounded. On 19 July two police officers on patrol in Haifa were shot in the back and killed. The following day the 3rd Parachute Brigade cordoned the area and imposed a night time curfew, which was not lifted until 30 July.

Leadership of the division changed again on 19 August, when Major General Hugh Stockwell was given command. In October the British War Office announced the division would be reduced by one brigade. The 3rd Parachute Brigade was disbanded, leaving the 1st Parachute Brigade in Palestine and the 2nd Parachute Brigade in England. The 1st Parachute Brigade assumed responsibility for Haifa and to cover all its commitments the 2nd Battalion Middlesex Regiment was attached to the brigade.

At a meeting on 29 November, the United Nations General Assembly decided to end the British Mandate on 1 August 1948. Palestine would be partitioned into separate Arab and Jewish states, with Jerusalem becoming an international city. The Jewish state would have fifty-six per cent of the land with a population of 490,000 Jews and 325,000 Arabs, while the Arab state would have 807,000 Arabs, but only 10,000 Jews. The population of Jerusalem would be around 105,000 Arabs to 100,000 Jews.

On 13 December trouble came from another quarter, in the town of Safed, opposite the Golan Heights. Fighting had started between the Arab and Jewish inhabitants. The police requested help from the army and a company from the 8th Parachute Battalion was assigned the task. Arabs fired at the British unit on 21 December without causing any injuries.

=== 1948 ===
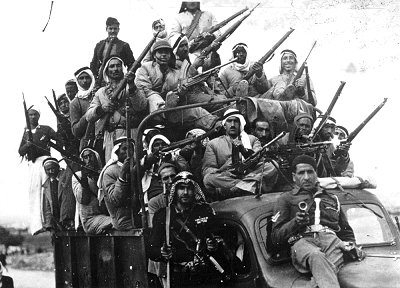
Arab irregulars in Palestine, 1947

Tension in the Golan Heights area remained high and on 9 January the Jewish settlements of Dan and Kfar Szold were attacked by Arab irregulars from the Arab Liberation Army, who crossed the border from Syria. The division responded by immediately sending a troop of armoured cars from the 17th/21st Lancers to each village. By the afternoon the 1st Parachute Battalion had joined the battle and air support from the Royal Air Force was called in. The battle ended with the Arabs withdrawing; their casualties are not known. Nine Jews were killed or wounded by the Arabs, the British troops uninjured.

To assist in controlling the region, an ad hoc formation called Craforce was established. Under the command of the division's commander, Royal Artillery Brigadier C. H. Colquhoun, were the division's artillery, the 17th/21st Lancers, the 1st Parachute Battalion and the 1st Battalion Irish Guards. Craforce became involved with breaking up attacks between Arab and Jewish forces. The Arabs did not directly attack the British, but did engage them when British attempted to intervene in an attack on Jewish settlements.

In February the Arab Liberation Army, under the command of Fawzi al-Qawuqji, was estimated to be around 10,000 strong. It was believed around 1,000 volunteers from neighbouring Arab states joined each month.

On 18 February it was announced that the 6th Airborne Division would be disbanded when they left Palestine. The 1st Parachute Brigade handed over Haifa to the 1st Guards Brigade on 6 April. Gradually the division's units left the country. The division's last units, comprising part of divisional headquarters, the 1st Parachute Battalion and the 1st Airborne Squadron Royal Engineers, departed on 18 May.

== Aftermath ==
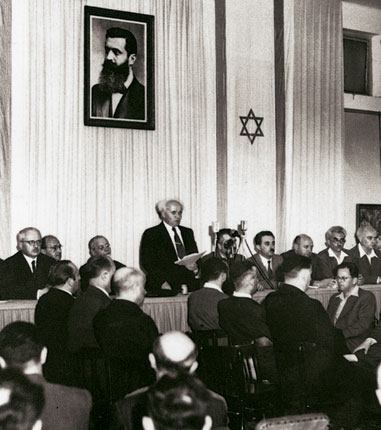
David Ben-Gurion reading out the Israeli Declaration of Independence

Since the end of the Second World War, the campaign in the British Mandate of Palestine had cost the British 338 dead. The numbers for the 6th Airborne Division between October 1945 and April 1948 were fifty-eight men dead and 236 wounded due to enemy action, a further ninety-nine men died, from causes not associated with a hostile act. During their searches of Jewish and Arab settlements, men from the division had located 99 mortars, 34 machine guns, 174 sub machine guns, 375 rifles, 391 pistols, 97 land mines, 2,582 hand grenades and 302,530 rounds of ammunition.

In February 1948 the 2nd Parachute Brigade moved from England to Germany, becoming part of the British Army of the Rhine. The 6th Airborne Division was disbanded in April 1948, shortly after their return to England, leaving the 2nd Parachute Brigade as the only brigade-sized airborne formation in the British Army.

On 14 May, the day before the end of the British mandate, David Ben-Gurion, chairman of the Jewish Agency for Palestine, announced the establishment of the state of Israel in parts of what was known as the British Mandate of Palestine. The announcement was the catalyst for the start of the 1948 Arab–Israeli War.

== Notes ==
Footnotes

Citations
