= Touffréville =

- Commune
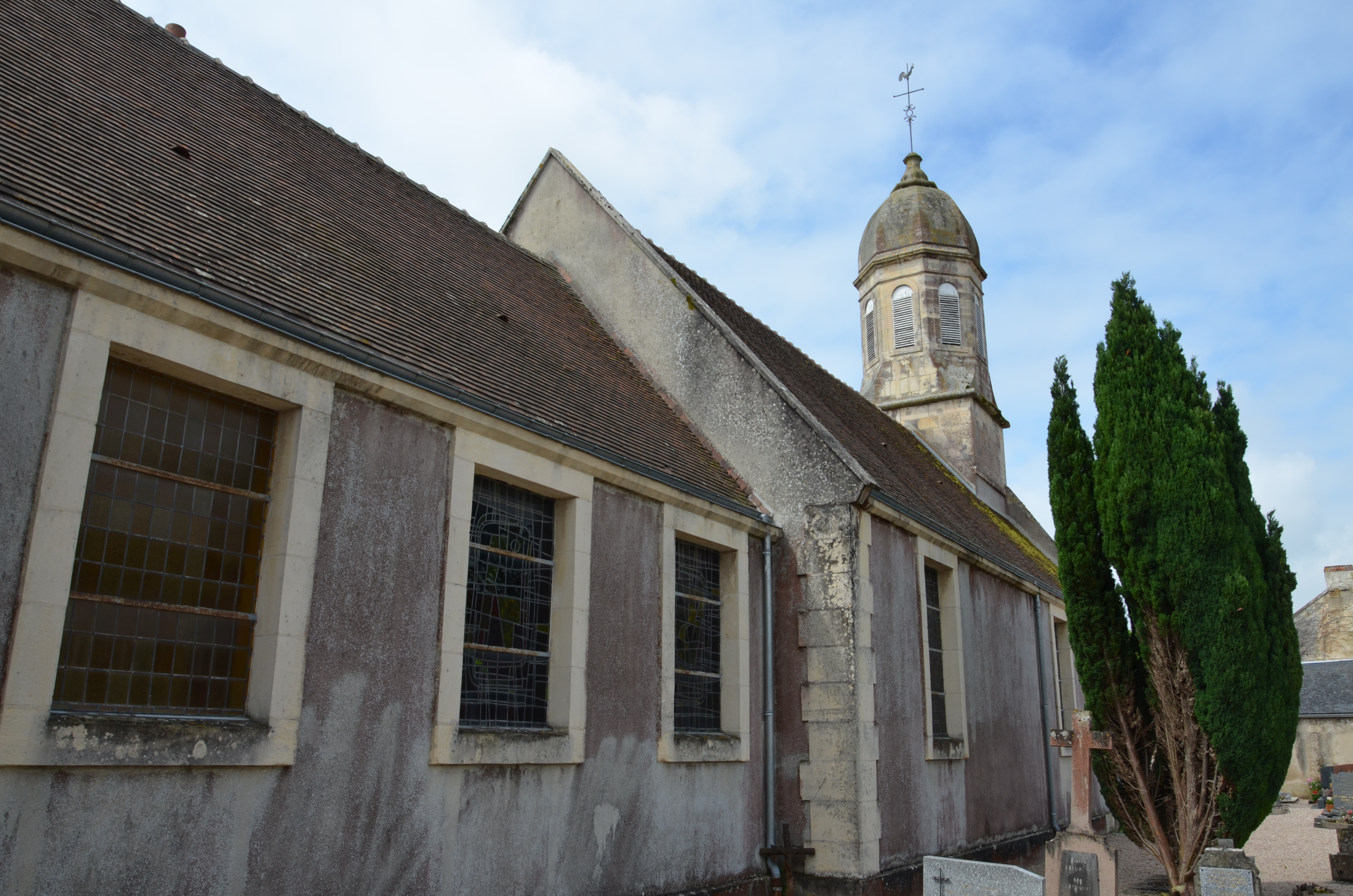
- The church in Touffréville

- Coat of arms
- Location of Touffréville
- Location within France Location within Normandy
- Coordinates: 49°11′26″N 0°13′23″W
- Country: France
- Region: Normandy
- Department: Calvados
- Arrondissement: Lisieux
- Canton: Troarn
- Intercommunality: CC Normandie-Cabourg-Pays d'Auge

Government
  - Mayor (2020–2026): Annie-France Gerard
- Area^{1}: 5.75 km^{2} (2.22 sq mi)
- Elevation: 12 m (39 ft)
- Highest elevation: 68 m (223 ft)
- Lowest elevation: 9 m (30 ft)
- Population (2023): 392
  - Density: 68.2/km^{2} (177/sq mi)
- Time zone: UTC+01:00 (CET)
  - Summer (DST): UTC+02:00 (CEST)
- INSEE/Postal code: 14698 /14940
- ^{1} French Land Register data, which excludes lakes, ponds, glaciers > 1 km^{2} (0.386 sq mi or 247 acres) and river estuaries.

Touffréville (French pronunciation: [tufʁevil]) is a commune in the Calvados department in the Normandy region in northwestern France.

== Population ==
Historical population
| Year | Pop. | ±% p.a. |
|---|---|---|
| 1968 | 248 | — |
| 1975 | 262 | +0.79% |
| 1982 | 254 | −0.44% |
| 1990 | 281 | +1.27% |
| 1999 | 292 | +0.43% |
| 2007 | 303 | +0.46% |
| 2012 | 265 | −2.64% |
| 2017 | 372 | +7.02% |
| 2023 | 392 | +0.88% |
Source: INSEE

== See also ==
- Communes of the Calvados department
