= Ashutosh Sabharwal =

Professor and Ph.D of electrical engineering from Rice University

Ashutosh Sabharwal is a professor of electrical engineering from Rice University, Houston, TX. He received the Ph.D. in the field in 1999 from The Ohio State University. He was named Fellow of the Institute of Electrical and Electronics Engineers (IEEE) in 2014 for contributions to the theory and experimentation of wireless systems and networks. He was named to the 2022 class of ACM Fellows, "for the invention of full-duplex wireless and open-source wireless research platforms".
