= Annebault =

- Commune
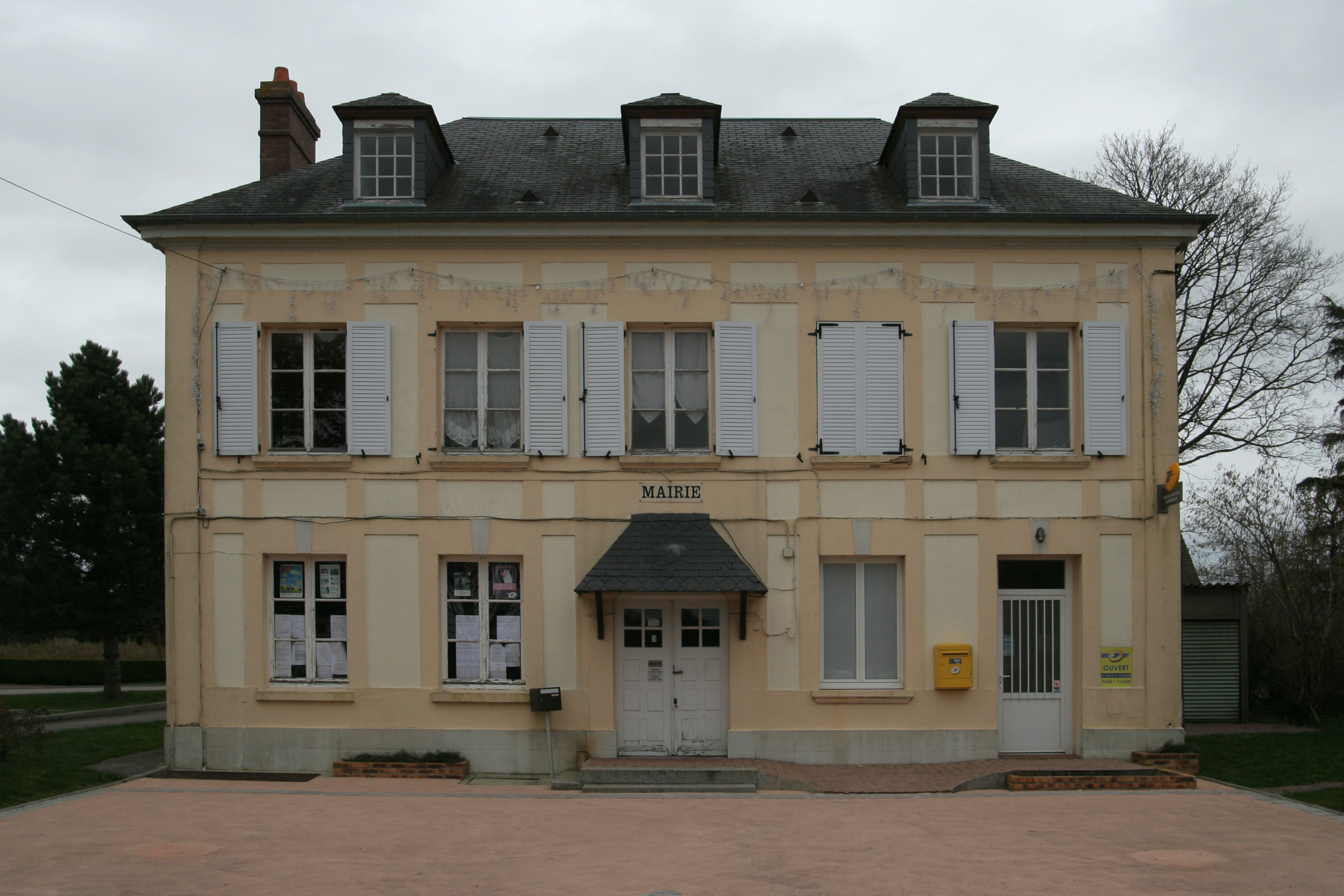
- The town hall in Annebault
- Location of Annebault
- Location within France Location within Normandy
- Coordinates: 49°15′11″N 0°03′36″E
- Country: France
- Region: Normandy
- Department: Calvados
- Arrondissement: Lisieux
- Canton: Cabourg
- Intercommunality: CC Terre d'Auge

Government
  - Mayor (2020–2026): Chantal Leneveu
- Area^{1}: 5.54 km^{2} (2.14 sq mi)
- Elevation: 141 m (463 ft)
- Highest elevation: 153 m (502 ft)
- Lowest elevation: 60 m (200 ft)
- Population (2023): 521
  - Density: 94.0/km^{2} (244/sq mi)
- Time zone: UTC+01:00 (CET)
  - Summer (DST): UTC+02:00 (CEST)
- INSEE/Postal code: 14016 /14430
- ^{1} French Land Register data, which excludes lakes, ponds, glaciers > 1 km^{2} (0.386 sq mi or 247 acres) and river estuaries.

Annebault (French pronunciation: [anbo]) is a commune in the Calvados department in the Normandy region in northwestern France.

== Geography ==
Annebault is located in the pays d'Auge, 17 kilometers from Lisieux.

== Toponymy ==
The village Annebault was first mentioned as Olnebac in the beginning of the 12th century, and as Ounebaus in 1195.

Several different theories have been proposed to explain the origins of this name. French linguist René Lepelley has proposed that the name comes from the Old Norrois "almr balkr", or "splitting of the elm". On the other hand, Ernest Nègre, toponymist and specialist in Occitan, has offered that it is derived from the Germanic personal name Allinus followed by the Old Norse bekkr. Yet another theory, courtesy of Albert Dauzat and Charles Rostaing, holds that Annebault derives from the Germanic personal name Hanno followed by Germanic bald, or bold. Ultimately, despite this plethora of suggestions, the origins of "Annebault" remain obscure.

== History ==
The vestiges of a feudal moat, possibly dating to the tenth century, can be found to the south of the town, in the nearby forest.

== Population ==
Historical population
Year	Pop.	±% p.a.
1968	253	—
1975	253	+0.00%
1982	259	+0.34%
1990	317	+2.56%
1999	347	+1.01%
2007	407	+2.01%
2012	415	+0.39%
2017	448	+1.54%
2023	521	+2.55%
Source: INSEE

== Personalities ==
Claude d'Annebault (circa 1495-1552) was a French military man who became an admiral and was named Admiral of France in 1544.

== See also ==
- Communes of the Calvados department
