= Ashutosh Sharma (colonel) =

Indian Army officer (martyred 2020)

Colonel Ashutosh Sharma SM ***
- Born: 3 July 1975; Bulandshahr, Uttar Pradesh, India
- Died: 2 May 2020 (aged 44); Handwara, Kupwara district, Jammu and Kashmir, India
- Spouse: Pallavi Sharma (m. 2010–2020)
- Military career
- Allegiance: India
- Branch: Indian Army
- Service years: 2001-2020
- Rank: Colonel
- Unit: Brigade of the Guards
- Commands: 21 Rashtriya Rifles
- Awards: Second bar to Sena Medal; Bar to Sena Medal; Sena Medal

Colonel Ashutosh Sharma, SM & two bars (died 2 May 2020) was an Indian Army officer. He was the commanding officer of the 21st battalion, Rashtriya Rifles. On 2 May 2020, he was martyred in action while leading encounter in Handwara in the Kupwara district of Jammu and Kashmir. He was awarded the Sena Medal for gallantry three times, the first bar to the Sena Medal being awarded a few months before his death and the second bar posthumously.

== Early life and education ==
Sharma was born in Bulandshahr in Uttar Pradesh to Shambhu Dutt Pathak, a soil conservation officer, and Sudha Sharma. The family hailed from the Parwana Mahmodpur village of Aurangabad area in Bulandshahr. He completed his schooling and graduation in Bulandshahr and attended the DAV Inter College. Sharma wanted to join the Indian Army from a young age and attempted to join for over six years. He was successful in his thirteenth attempt and joined the Officers Training Academy (OTA), Chennai. At OTA, he was part of the hockey team and represented the academy at the Inter Academy Games held at Indian Military Academy (IMA), Dehradun.

== Military career ==
Sharma graduated from OTA, Chennai (SSC - 72), and was commissioned into the 19th battalion, Brigade of the Guards on 1 September 2001. In his two decades of service in the Army, he was a part of multiple successful counter-insurgency operations in Jammu and Kashmir.

Sharma was awarded the Sena Medal for gallantry on 26 January 2018. In 2019, he shot, at close range, a terrorist who was rushing towards his men and personnel of the Jammu and Kashmir Police with a hidden grenade, preventing him front harming them. For this action, on 15 August 2019, when serving as the commanding officer of the 21st battalion, Rashtriya Rifles, he was awarded the bar to Sena Medal.

On 2 May 2020, intelligence reports were received indicating the presence of terrorists inside a house in the Changimulla village near Handwara. The civilians were held hostage. Sharma launched a cordon and search operation with the J&K police. The civilians were rescued and the team came under heavy fire. The communication links with the team were lost. After an 18-hour operation, the two terrorists were killed. Apart from Sharma, four other Indian security forces personnel were killed in the encounter, including Major Anuj Sood, SC. Sharma was the first commanding officer in the last five years to have lost his life in an encounter.

== Honours and legacy ==
Sharma was cremated with full military honours on 5 May 2020 in Jaipur. The Chief Minister Ashok Gehlot, Deputy Chief Minister Sachin Pilot and the General Officer Commanding-in-Chief South Western Command, Lieutenant General Alok Singh Kler paid their respects to the brave-heart and offered condolences to his family. Also present were the Member of Parliament Rajyavardhan Singh Rathore, Pratap Singh Khachariyawas, Minister for Ex- Servicemen Welfare Rajasthan and the Commissioner of Police and the District Collector of Jaipur.

In the 2021 Republic Day honours list, Sharma was posthumously decorated with the second bar to the sena medal.

== Personal life ==
Sharma was married to Pallavi Sharma and the couple had a daughter, Tamanna.
