= Cordon and search =

Military tactic in counterinsurgency operations

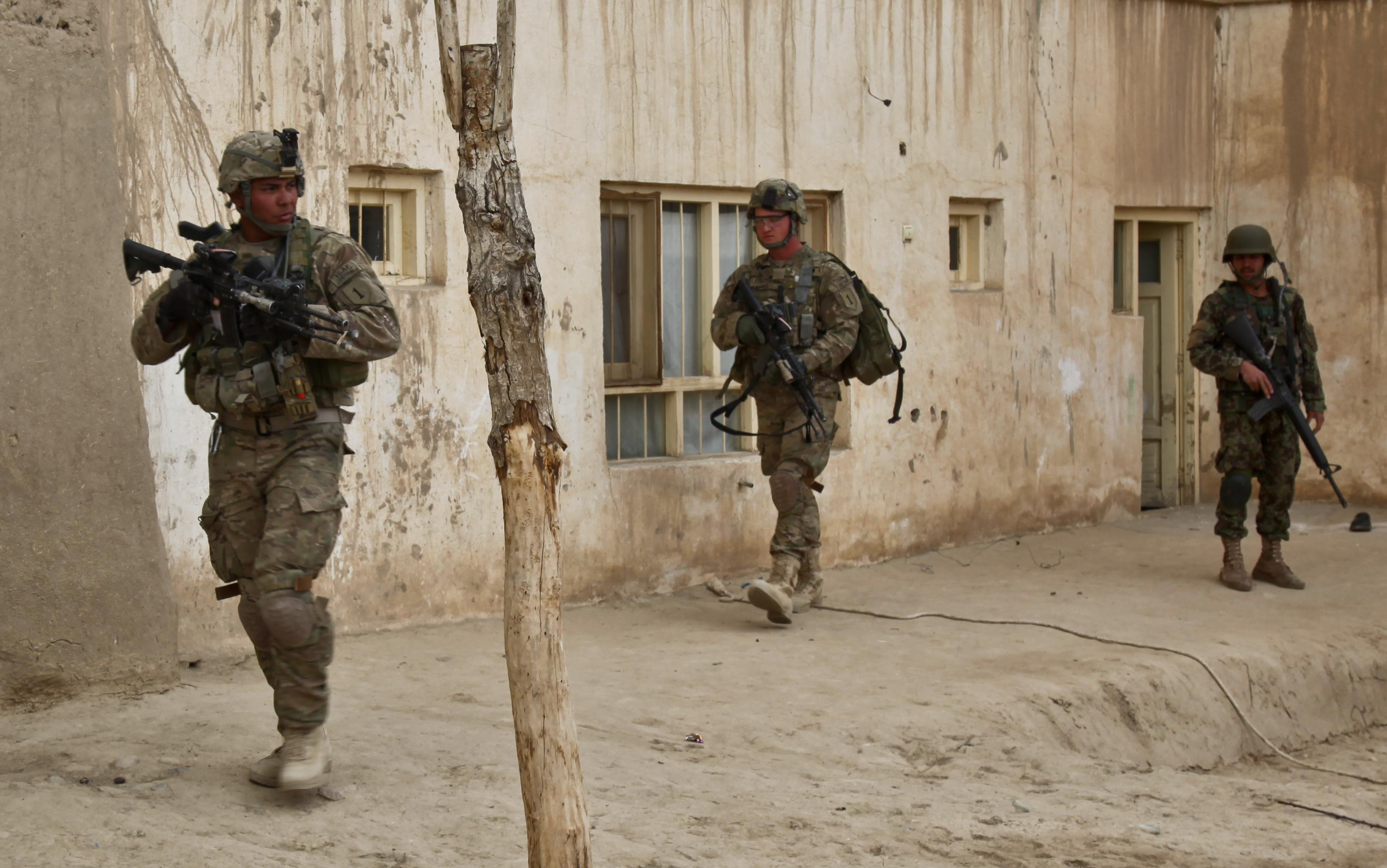
The United States and Afghan National Army cordon and search operation in Ghazni Province, Afghanistan, in 2011.

WW II house search (reenactment)

Cordon and search is a military tactic to cordon off an area and search the premises for weapons or insurgents. It is one of the basic counterinsurgency operations. Two types of cordon and search operations are cordon and knock and cordon and kick (or cordon and enter).

In a cordon and knock operation, counterinsurgency forces assemble around an area to provide security ("cordon") and then obtain permission to search the area from residents ("knock"). The occupants may be asked to leave buildings prior to the search, to avoid physical contact and conflict between the search party and the building occupants. This is called a tactical callout. A cordon and ask operation involves the assistance of local authorities. If permission is denied but the residents are thought to be friendly or neutral, counterinsurgency force leaders may decide not to search an area.

A cordon and kick or cordon and enter operation is more forceful than cordon and knock. It is performed without obtaining permission of the occupants. It may be done because permission is not given for a cordon and knock operation; however, if resistance is expected, a cordon and kick operation may be planned from the start. The type of force used to enter the building may range from simply opening a door to using explosives.

Cordon and knock is a relatively new technique in military operations. It has taken over the old term of a simple house search. It is part of new doctrine called Stability and Support Operations or SASO. It is a technique used where there is no hard intelligence of weapons in the house and therefore is less intense than a normal house search. It is used in urban neighborhoods. The purpose of the mission is to search a house with as little inconvenience to the resident family as possible.

== See also ==
- Enforced disappearance – Unlawful secret disappearance
- Łapanka – World War II roundups by Germans in Poland
- Shootout – Combat between two parties using firearms
- Zachistka – Russian military slang for armed patrols and house searches, often with human-rights abuses
