= Digby Tatham-Warter =

British Army officer (1917-1993)

Major Digby Tatham-Warter DSO
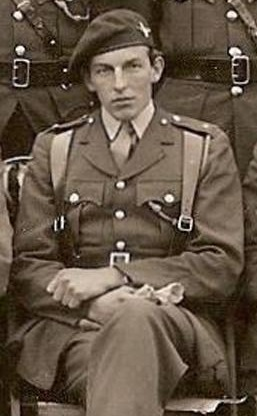
- Digby in 1944
- Born: Allison Digby Tatham-Warter; 21 May 1917; Atcham, Shropshire, England
- Died: 21 March 1993 (aged 75); Nanyuki, Kenya
- Military career
- Allegiance: United Kingdom
- Branch: British Army
- Service years: 1937–1946
- Rank: Major
- Nickname: "Digby"
- Service number: 75060
- Units: Oxfordshire and Buckinghamshire Light Infantry; Parachute Regiment
- Conflicts: Second World War: Battle of Arnhem; Mau Mau Uprising
- Awards: Distinguished Service Order
- Other work: Safari operator

Major Allison Digby Tatham-Warter, DSO (21 May 1917 – 21 March 1993), also known as Digby Tatham-Warter or just Digby, was a British Army officer who fought in the Second World War and was famed for wearing a bowler hat and carrying an umbrella into battle.

== Early life ==
Digby was born in Atcham, Shropshire, on 21 May 1917. He was the second son of Henry de Grey Tatham-Warter, a landowner with several estates in the southwest of England. Digby's father fought in the First World War with the Artists Rifles; he was gassed in the trenches, and later died when Digby was 11. Digby was educated at Wellington College, Berkshire.

== Early military career ==
In 1935 he was accepted into the Royal Military College, Sandhurst. Digby passed out of Sandhurst on 21 January 1937 and was commissioned as a second lieutenant into the Unattached List for the British Indian Army with a view to joining the Indian Army due to his family connections. He was attached to the 2nd Battalion, Oxfordshire and Buckinghamshire Light Infantry, then serving in India, from 13 March 1937, and subsequently transferred to that regiment 27 April 1938 (never joining the Indian Army) so that he would be able to continue his hobbies of tiger hunting and pig sticking.

== Second World War ==
When the Second World War broke out, Digby was not initially sent to fight in Europe. His sister Kit served in the Western Desert Campaign and was awarded the French Croix de guerre while serving with the Hadfield-Spears Unit. Upon hearing of his brother John's death at the Second Battle of El Alamein in late 1942 with the 2nd Dragoon Guards, The Queen's Bays, Digby volunteered for the airborne forces and transferred to the Parachute Regiment. He was appointed as the company commander of A Company of the 2nd Parachute Battalion, part of the 1st Parachute Brigade of the 1st Airborne Division. He was stationed in Grantham, Lincolnshire, during training. His tiger hunting exploits were well known, and his reputation was enhanced as he was able to obtain the use of an American Dakota aeroplane in which he flew all the company officers in the camp to London for a party at the Ritz.

A Company was then chosen by the battalion's commanding officer, Lieutenant Colonel John Frost, to lead the 2nd Parachute Battalion in the Battle of Arnhem, part of Operation Market Garden, because of Digby's reputation of being an aggressive commander. In preparation Digby, concerned about the unreliability of radios, educated his men on how to use bugle calls that had been used during the Napoleonic Wars for communication in case the radios failed. He also took an umbrella with his kit as a means of identification because he had trouble remembering passwords and felt that anyone who saw him with it would think that "only a bloody fool of an Englishman" would carry an umbrella into battle.

A Company was dropped away from the target of Arnhem Bridge and had to go through Arnhem, where the streets were blocked by German forces. Digby led his men through the back gardens of nearby houses instead of attempting to advance through the streets and thus avoided the Germans. Digby and A Company managed to travel 8 miles in 7 hours while also taking prisoner 150 German soldiers, including members of the SS. During the battle, Digby wore his maroon beret instead of a helmet and waved his umbrella while walking about the defences despite heavy mortar fire. When the Germans started using tanks to cross the bridge, Digby led a bayonet charge against them wearing a bowler hat. He later disabled a German armoured car with his umbrella, incapacitating the driver by shoving the umbrella through the car's observational slit and poking the driver in the eye.

Digby then noticed the chaplain pinned down by enemy fire while trying to cross the street to get to injured soldiers. Digby got to him and said "Don't worry about the bullets, I've got an umbrella". He then escorted the chaplain across the street under his umbrella. When he returned to the front line, one of his fellow officers said about his umbrella that "that thing won't do you any good", to which Digby replied "Oh my goodness Pat, but what if it rains?" Digby was later injured by shrapnel, which also cut open the rear of his trousers, but continued to fight until A Company had run out of ammunition. Despite the radios being unreliable as Digby had predicted and the bugle calls being used most in the battle, the message "out of ammo, God save The King" was radioed out before Digby was captured.

Because of his injury, Digby was sent to St Elizabeth's Hospital but escaped out of a window with his second-in-command, Captain Tony Frank, when the German nurses left them alone. After creating an escape compass from buttons on his uniform, Digby and Frank headed towards Mariendaal. Upon arriving, they were hidden by a Dutch woman who spoke no English, before being put in contact with her neighbour. He disguised them as painters and moved them to Derk Wildeboer's house. Wildeboer was a local leader of the Dutch Resistance in Ede. They then met Menno de Nooy of the Dutch Resistance, who gave them a bicycle. Wildeboer had a fake Dutch identity card made for Digby to allow him to pose as Peter Jansen, the deaf-mute son of a lawyer. Digby used the bicycle to visit fellow soldiers in hiding and the Germans did not recognise him despite him helping to push a Nazi staff car out of a ditch and German soldiers being billeted in the same house in which he was staying. Digby then gathered 150 escaped soldiers to head towards the front line. This was known as Operation Pegasus. Digby and the soldiers cycled to the Rhine and Digby flashed a V for Victory sign using Morse Code with his torch. Members of XXX Corps then ferried them across the river. Upon return to the United Kingdom, Digby was awarded the Distinguished Service Order. He also wrote a report on the Battle of Arnhem Bridge that resulted in Lieutenant Jack Grayburn's posthumously receiving a promotion to captain and being awarded the Victoria Cross.

== Later life ==
After the war ended, Digby served in British-controlled Mandatory Palestine before being appointed to the 5th King's African Rifles in British Kenya in 1946, where he also bought two estates in Eburru and Nanyuki. During the Mau Mau Uprising, Digby raised a volunteer mounted police force at his own expense and led them into battle against the Mau Mau. He then retired to run his estates. He also created the concept of the modern safari where animals would be photographed rather than hunted. During Kenyan independence, it is reported that the British Defence staff told the British High Commissioner to "look after Tatham-Warter".

== Personal life ==
Tatham-Warter married in 1949 Jane Boyd, daughter of Captain Roderick Bulteel Boyd (farmer in Nanyuki, Kenya) and granddaughter of Arthur George Egerton, 5th Earl of Wilton, and they had three daughters and several grandchildren. Their daughter Belinda Rose Tatham-Warter (born 1954) married in Nanyuki German aristocrat Friedrich von Oldenburg, great-grandson of Frederick Augustus II, last ruling Grand Duke of Oldenburg. Digby died in Nanyuki on 21 March 1993.

== See also ==
- Jack Churchill
- Alfred Wintle

== Bibliography ==
- Thornton, Neil (2022). Arnhem Umbrella: Major Digby Tatham Warter DSO. Fonthill Media. ISBN 978-1874351276.
