= Battle of Arnhem =

1944 British airborne operation in the Netherlands

- Part of Operation Market Garden
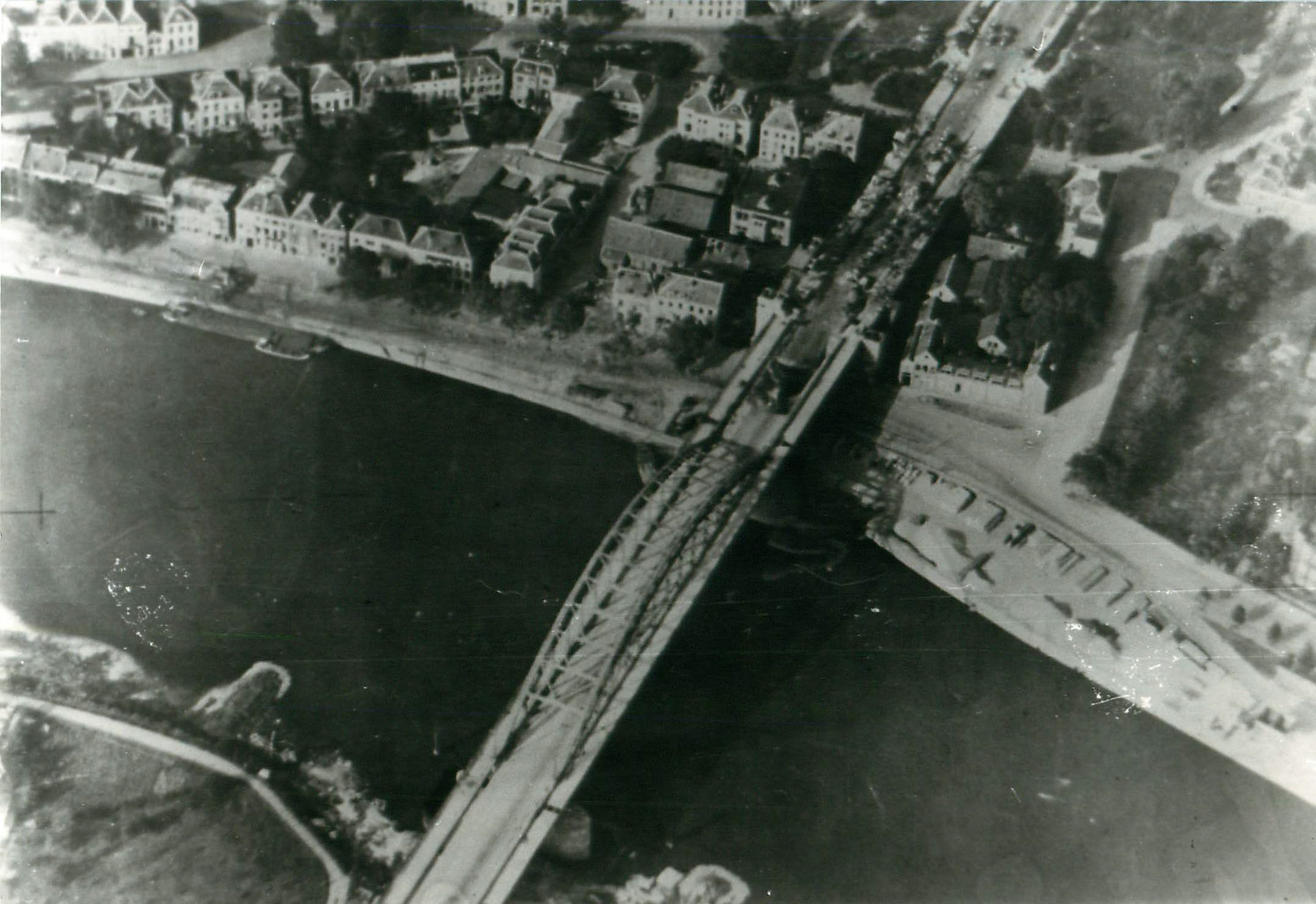
- Aerial reconnaissance photo of the Arnhem road bridge taken by the Royal Air Force on 19 September, showing signs of the British defence on the northern ramp and wrecked German vehicles from the previous day's fighting.
Date	17–26 September 1944 (1 week and 2 days)
Location	Arnhem, Gelderland, Netherlands 51°58′49″N 5°54′01″E
Result	German victory

Belligerents
United Kingdom; Poland	Germany

Commanders and leaders
Roy Urquhart; John Frost (POW); Stanisław Sosabowski	Walter Model; Wilhelm Bittrich

Strength
1 reinforced airborne division; 1 parachute infantry brigade	1 Kampfgruppe; 1 panzer division

Casualties and losses
c. 1,984 killed 6,854 captured Total: 8,838	c. 1,300 killed 2,000 wounded – 5,175 killed or wounded

The Battle of Arnhem was fought during the Second World War, as part of the Allied Operation Market Garden. It took place around the Dutch city of Arnhem from 17 to 26 September 1944. The Allies had swept through France and Belgium in August 1944, after the Battle of Normandy. Market Garden was based upon the smaller Operation Comet that had been overtaken by events. Field Marshal Sir Bernard Montgomery, who favoured a single push northwards over the branches of the Lower Rhine River, allowing the British Second Army to bypass the Siegfried Line and attack the important Ruhr industrial area.

The First Allied Airborne Army was to capture the bridges to secure a route for the Second Army with US, British and Polish airborne troops dropped in the Netherlands along the line of the ground advance, being relieved by the British XXX Corps. Farthest north, the British 1st Airborne Division landed at Arnhem to capture bridges across the Nederrijn (Lower Rhine), with the 1st Polish Parachute Brigade following on. XXX Corps was expected to reach Arnhem in two to three days.

The 1st Airborne Division landed some distance from its objectives and met unexpected resistance, especially from elements of the II SS Panzer Korps. Only a small force was able to reach the Arnhem road bridge while the main body of the division was stopped on the edge of town. The XXX Corps advance northwards from Nijmegen was delayed due to the failure, in the Battle of Nijmegen, to secure the bridge before the ground troops arrived and the British were not relieved in time. After four days, the small British force at the bridge was overwhelmed and the rest of the division was trapped in a small pocket north of the river.

The paratroops could not be sufficiently reinforced by the Poles or by XXX Corps when they arrived on the south bank, nor by Royal Air Force supply flights. After nine days of fighting, the remnants of the division were withdrawn in Operation Berlin. The Allies were unable to advance further and the front line stabilised south of Arnhem. The 1st Airborne Division lost nearly three quarters of its strength and did not see combat again.

== Background ==
By September 1944, Allied forces had broken out of their Normandy beachhead and pursued the remnants of the German armies across northern France and Belgium. Although Allied commanders generally favoured a broad front policy to continue the advance into Germany and the Netherlands, Field Marshal Bernard Montgomery proposed a bold plan to head north through Dutch Gelderland, bypassing the German Siegfried Line defences and opening a route into the German industrial heartland of the Ruhr. Initially proposed as a British and Polish operation codenamed Operation Comet, the plan was soon expanded to involve most of the First Allied Airborne Army and a set-piece ground advance into the Netherlands, codenamed Market Garden.

Montgomery's plan involved dropping the US 101st Airborne Division to capture bridges around Eindhoven, the US 82nd Airborne Division to capture crossings around Nijmegen and the British 1st Airborne Division, with the Polish 1st Independent Parachute Brigade, to capture three bridges across the Nederrijn at Arnhem. Lieutenant General Lewis Brereton commanded the First Allied Airborne Army but his second-in-command Lieutenant-General Frederick Browning took command of the airborne operation. The British Second Army, led by XXX Corps, would advance up the "Airborne corridor", securing the airborne divisions' positions and crossing the Rhine within two days. If successful, the plan would open the door to Germany and hopefully force an end to the war in Europe by the end of the year.

=== British plan ===
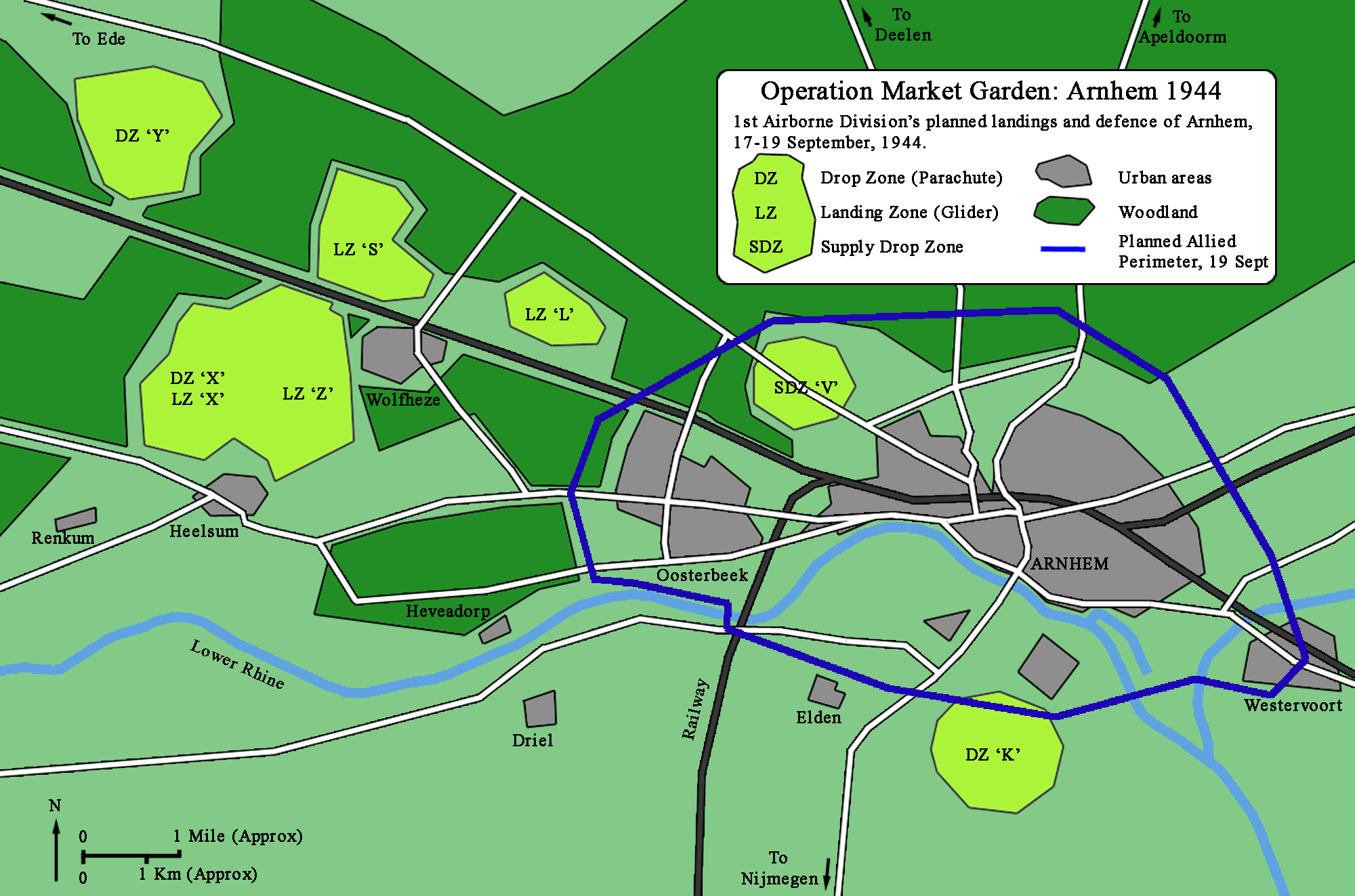
The planned British landings and defence at Arnhem

With the British 6th Airborne Division still refitting after Operation Tonga and the fighting in Normandy, the task of securing the Rhine bridgehead fell to the 1st Airborne Division under the command of Major-General Roy Urquhart. The division was made up of three brigades of infantry (two parachute, one glider-borne), supporting artillery of the 1st Airlanding Light Regiment and anti-tank batteries and Royal Engineer units, as well as supporting elements such as the Royal Army Service Corps and Royal Army Medical Corps.

Most of the division had seen action in North Africa and Sicily, particularly the 1st Parachute Brigade and 1st Airlanding Brigade. This was the first time the division had fought as a complete formation. Urquhart also had the 1st Independent Polish Parachute Brigade under his command. His force was also substantially reinforced by some 1,200 men of the Glider Pilot Regiment, who would fly the glider-borne infantry and vehicles into Arnhem, providing the equivalent of two battalions of infantry for the operation. Smaller additions included a Dutch commando unit and American communications teams.

The division was required to secure the road, rail and pontoon bridges over the Nederrijn at Arnhem and hold them for two to three days until relieved by XXX Corps. From the beginning Urquhart was severely constrained in his planning for the operation. The US IX Troop Carrier Command (Major General Williams) could not land all the airborne troops in one go. Williams decided that it would only be possible to fly one air lift per day, meaning it would take three days to deliver the division and Polish Brigade. Few areas were suitable for glider landings and Williams was reluctant to send his aircraft too close to Arnhem and into the flak from Deelen airfield after the drop. Urquhart was forced to pick drop zones (DZ) and landing zones (LZ) up to 8 mi (13 km) from Arnhem, on the north side of the river. With the need to secure the bridges, towns and drop zones for subsequent supply drops, the 1st Airborne would need to defend a perimeter 18 mi (29 km) long whilst waiting for XXX Corps.

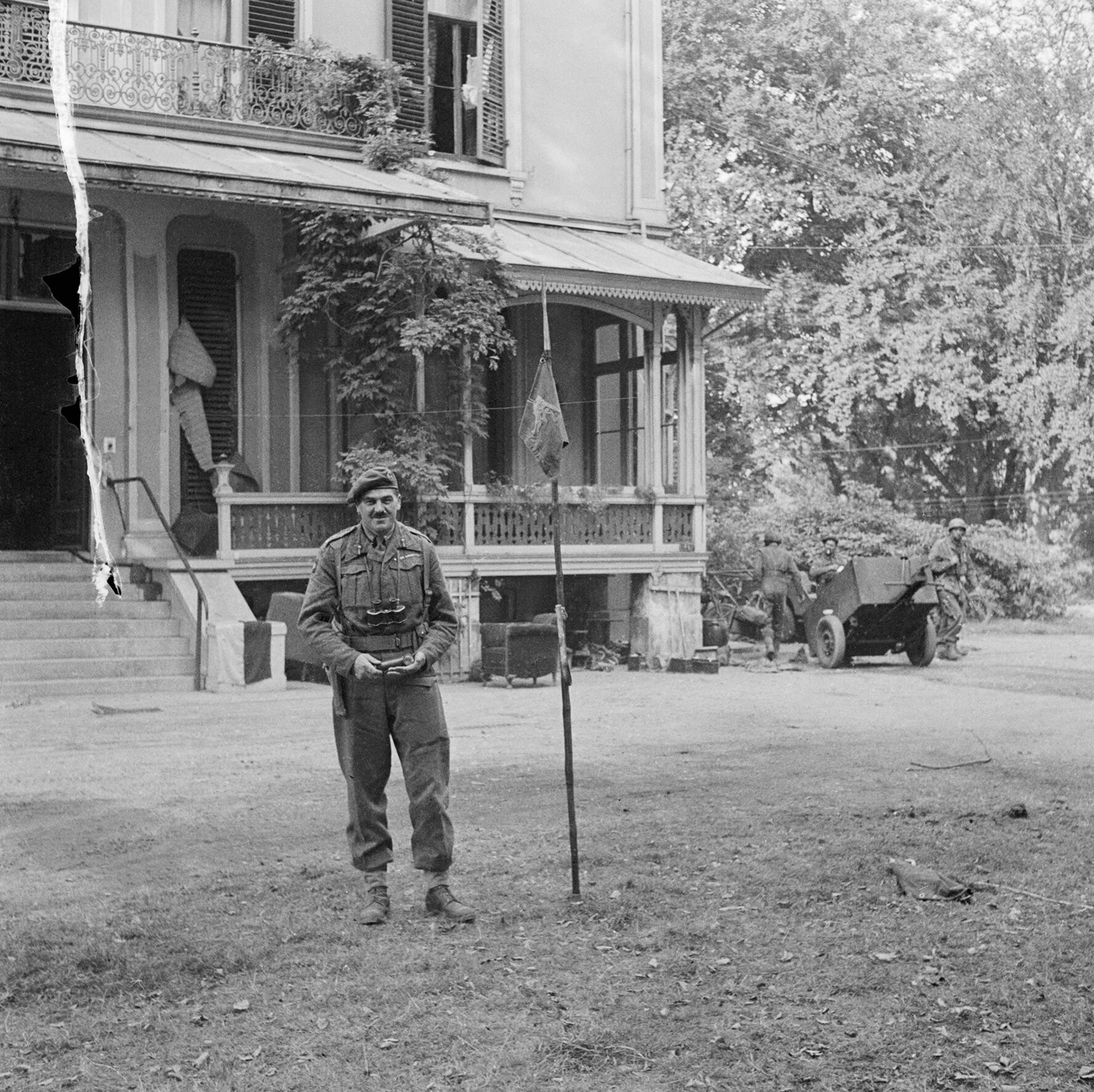
Major General Roy Urquhart shortly after returning to his Divisional HQ at the Hotel Hartenstein, 19 September

Urquhart decided to land the 1st Parachute Brigade (Brigadier Gerald Lathbury) and the 1st Airlanding Brigade (Brigadier Philip "Pip" Hicks') on the first day of the operation, along with Divisional HQ, the 1st Airlanding Light Regiment, Royal Artillery and attached Royal Engineer and medical units. The Airlanding Brigade would land on LZs 'S' and 'Z' and move to secure the drop zones and landing zones for the following days' drops, whilst the three battalions of the parachute brigade would arrive at DZ 'X' and follow separate routes to the Arnhem bridges. The 2nd Battalion (Lieutenant Colonel John Frost) would follow the riverside roads to the centre of Arnhem (Lion route) and secure the main road and railway bridges, as well as a pontoon bridge between them. The 3rd Battalion (Lieutenant Colonel Fitch) would head through Oosterbeek to Arnhem (Tiger route), assist in the capture of the road bridge and take up positions in the east of the town. The 1st Battalion (Lieutenant Colonel Dobie) would follow Leopard route north of the railway line to occupy high ground north and north west of Arnhem.

The advance into Arnhem would be led by a troop of jeeps from the 1st Airborne Reconnaissance Squadron (Major Frederick Gough) on Leopard route, who would attempt a coup de main on the road bridge. On the second day, the 4th Parachute Brigade (Brigadier John "Shan" Hackett) would arrive at DZ 'Y', accompanied by extra artillery units and the rest of the Airlanding Brigade on LZ 'X'. Hackett's three battalions would then reinforce the positions north and north west of Arnhem. On the third day, the 1st Independent Polish Parachute Brigade would be dropped south of the river at DZ 'K'. Using the road bridge, they would reinforce the perimeter east of Arnhem, linking with their artillery which would be flown in by glider to LZ 'L'. The 1st Airlanding Brigade would fall back to cover Oosterbeek on the western side of the perimeter and 1st Parachute Brigade would fall back to cover the southern side of the bridges. The remaining units of the division would follow XXX Corps on land in what was known as the sea tail. Once XXX Corps had arrived and advanced beyond the bridgehead, the 52nd (Lowland) Infantry Division would land at Deelen airfield to support the ground forces north of the Rhine. The operation would be supplied by daily flights by 38 Group and 46 Group RAF who would make the first drop on LZ 'L' on day 2 and subsequent drops on DZ 'V'.

=== Intelligence ===
The division was told to expect only limited resistance from German reserve forces. A serious challenge to their operation was not expected and many men believed that their work would lead to the ending of the war. Some – anticipating a period of occupation in Germany – packed leisure equipment in their kit or in the sea tail. Browning's intelligence officer – Major Brian Urquhart – obtained information from the 21st Army Group in Belgium and Dutch resistance that German armour was present around Arnhem. This was backed up with aerial reconnaissance that he ordered to be flown. Browning was dismissive and ordered his chief medical officer to have Urquhart sent on sick leave. SHAEF was aware that there were almost certainly two Panzer divisions at Arnhem but with the operation looming chose to ignore them. Such information would have been gleaned from Ultra intercepts that the First Allied Airborne Army was not privy to and therefore could not act upon.

Oreste Pinto, a Dutch counterintelligence officer who Dwight Eisenhower said was "the greatest living authority on security" and head of the Netherlands Counter-Intelligence Mission at SHAEF, maintained that the Germans were forewarned by a traitor in the Dutch resistance named Christiaan Lindemans who supplied information to the Abwehr, as did Basil Liddell Hart.

=== German forces ===
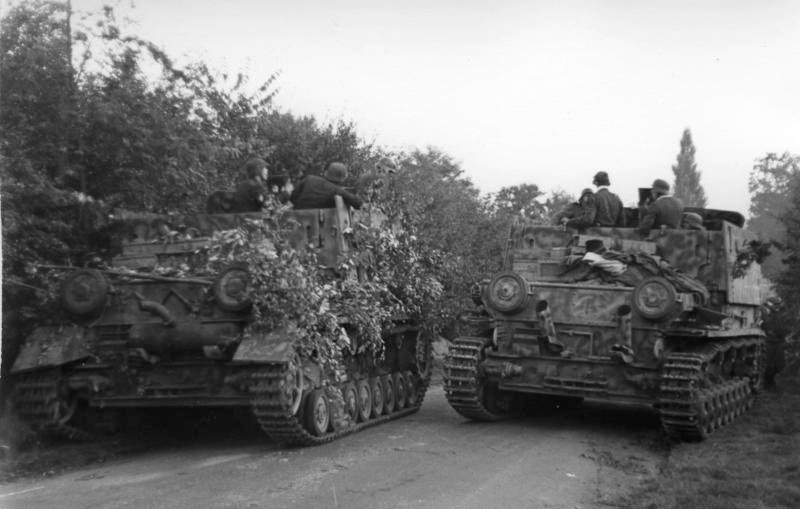
German self-propelled guns of the 9th SS Panzer Division during the battle. The presence of the II SS Panzer Corps would have a significant effect on the battle.

The Allied liberation of Antwerp on 4 September had caused German reserve troops in the Netherlands to flee, nicknamed "Mad Tuesday". The Allied pause at the Dutch border gave the Germans time to regroup but they were still disorganised and a true measure of the size of the German forces at Arnhem is difficult to establish. Generalfeldmarschall Walter Model, the commander of Army Group B had moved his headquarters to Arnhem and was re-establishing defences in the area and reorganising the German forces. By the time the Allies launched Market Garden several units were capable of opposing the offensive.

To the west of Arnhem Kampfgruppe Von Tettau was a force equivalent to seven battalions made up of a motley of German units (including Heer, Luftwaffe, Kriegsmarine, rear echelon and Waffen-SS troops) under the command of General Hans von Tettau at Grebbeberg. This included the SS Non-commissioned officer school SS Unteroffizierschule Arnheim and the 16th SS Panzergrenadier Training and Replacement Battalion under the command of SS Sturmbannführer Sepp Krafft. In Arnhem, the town garrison was under the command of Major-General Friedrich Kussin.

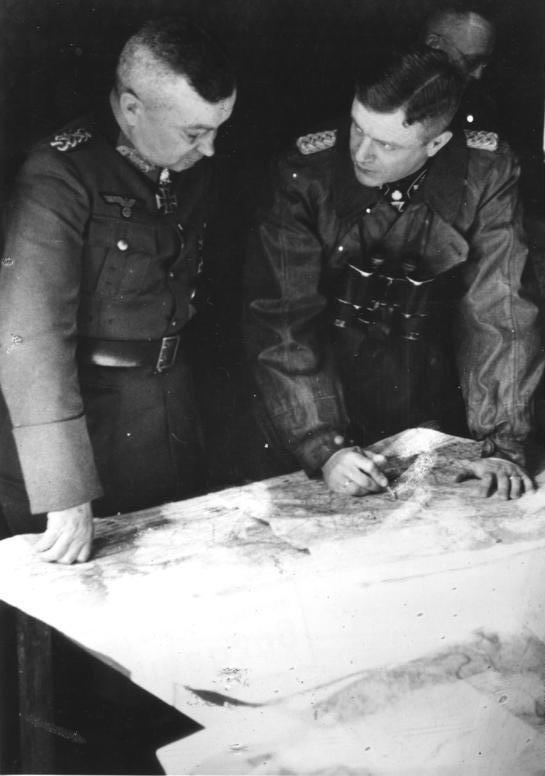
Walter Model and Heinz Harmel

North of Arnhem, the II SS Panzer Corps (Obergruppenführer Wilhelm Bittrich) the remnants of the 9th SS Panzer Division Hohenstaufen (Walter Harzer) and the 10th SS Panzer Division Frundsberg (Heinz Harmel) were refitting. The II SS Panzer Corps had been mauled in the fighting at Normandy and in their escape from the Falaise pocket. The survivors were experienced and their meant the Allies faced significantly more forces than they had been led to expect. The 9th SS Panzer Divisiion had a Panzergrenadier brigade, a reconnaissance battalion, an artillery battalion, two batteries of self-propelled guns and a company of tanks. The number of men who were available after the withdrawal from Normandy is unclear. Some sources suggest that the 9th SS Panzer Division had up to 6,000 men, others suggest that the combined total of the 9th SS Panzer Division and 10th SS Panzer Division was 6,000–7,000 men. The two divisions had been specially trained in anti-airborne operations; during their formation they had undergone month-long anti-airborne exercises whilst waiting for their heavy equipment. They had also spent some of the last 15 months studying the best reactions to a parachute attack in classroom and field exercises.

Dutch units allied to the Germans were also present at Arnhem. These formations recruited from Dutch nationals (mainly criminals, men wishing to avoid national service or men affiliated with the Nationaal-Socialistische Beweging) and were incorporated into the German Army. At Arnhem, the partly Dutch SS Wachbattalion 3 was attached to Kampfgruppe von Tettau and the 3rd Battalion of the SS Grenadier Regiment Landstorm Nederland training at nearby Hoogeveen was quickly attached to the 9th SS Panzer Division when it arrived on 20 September.

As the battle progressed, more German forces arrived and joined the fighting. Adolf Hitler was stunned by the audacious paratroop drop and ordered that the defence of the Netherlands should receive priority. Reinforcements streamed in from Wehrkreis VI, the Wesel area and Armed Forces Command Netherlands (General Friedrich Christiansen). Model arranged for reinforcements to be sent straight to the units in action and rushed in specialist urban warfare and machine gun battalions. Each day of the battle, the German military strength increased whilst the British supplies and manpower diminished. By 21 September, the fifth day of the battle, German forces outnumbered the British by 3:1 and continued to increase.

== Battle ==
=== Day 1 – Sunday 17 September ===
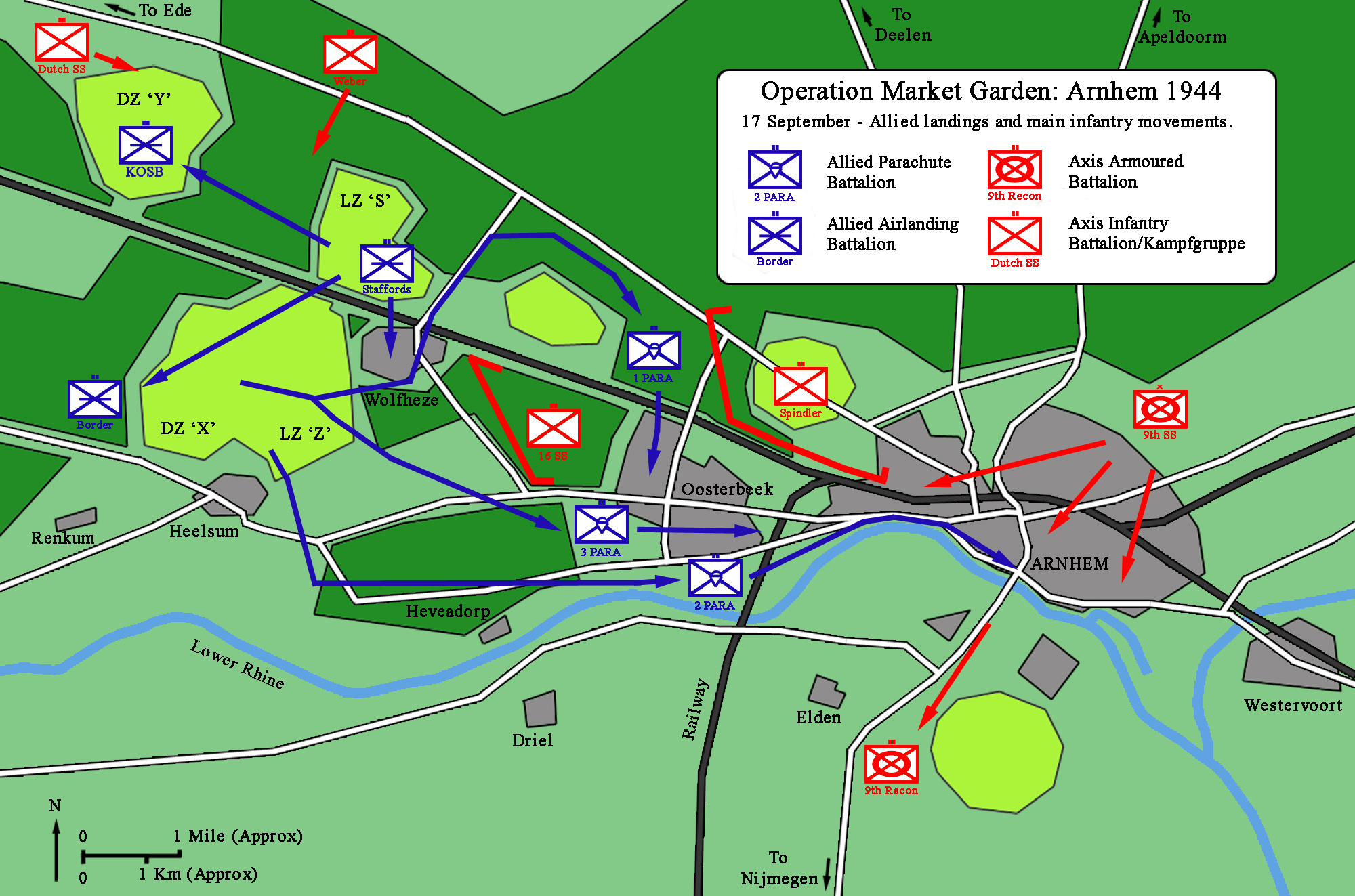
First infantry movements, 17 September.

The first lift was preceded by intense bombing and strafing by the British Second Tactical Air Force and the American 8th and 9th Air Forces. These attacked the flak guns and German garrisons and barracks in the area. The first lift suffered only light losses as the aircraft and gliders flew from England to the target. The first arrivals were the 21st Independent Parachute Company, who landed at 12:40 to mark the landing zones for the gliders and parachutists of the main force. The landings were largely unopposed and the battalions were formed up in good order and ready to carry out their tasks by 14:45.

The Airlanding Brigade moved quickly to secure the landing zones. The 2nd Battalion, South Staffordshire Regiment moved into Wolfheze, the 1st Battalion, Border Regiment secured DZ 'X', deploying its companies around the DZ and in Renkum and the 7th Battalion, King's Own Scottish Borderers moved to secure DZ 'Y'. Here, they ambushed the Dutch SS Wach Battalion as it headed toward Arnhem from Ede. Units of the Airlanding Artillery and Divisional HQ headed into Wolfheze and Oosterbeek where medical officers set up a Regimental Aid Post at the home of Kate ter Horst. While the 1st Airlanding Brigade moved off from the landing zones, the 1st Parachute Brigade prepared to head east toward the bridges, with Lathbury and his HQ Company following Frost on Lion route. Although some jeeps of the reconnaissance squadron were lost on the flight over, the company formed up in good strength and moved off along Leopard route.

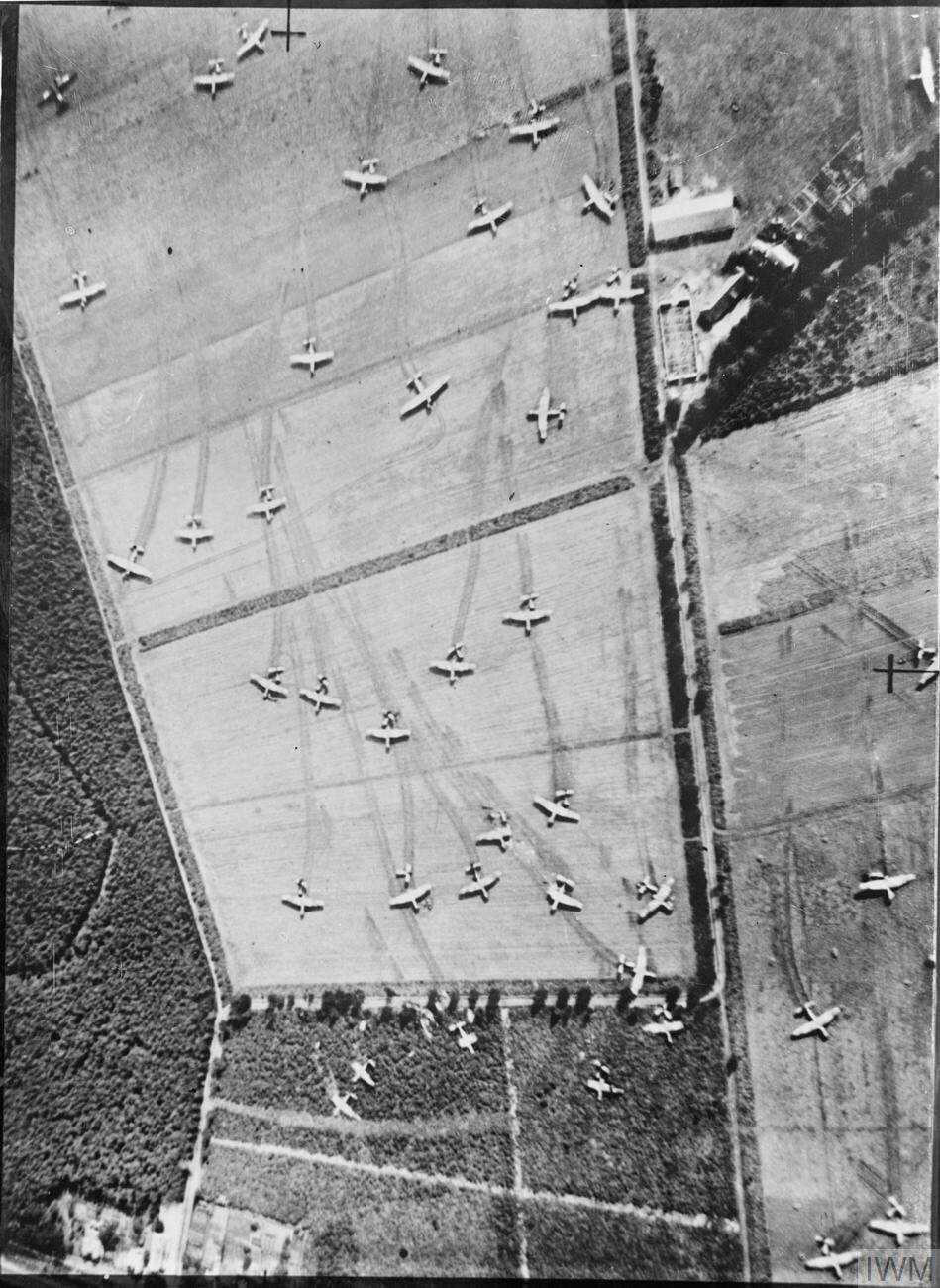
Horsa and Hamilcar gliders of the 1st Airlanding Brigade litter landing zone 'Z' west of Wolfheze, 17 September.

The Germans were unprepared for the landings and thrown into confusion. Model, erroneously assuming that the paratroopers had come to capture him, fled his headquarters at the Tafelberg Hotel in Oosterbeek and went to Bittrich's headquarters east of Arnhem at Doetinchem, where he took control of the battle. The 10th SS Panzer Division was sent south against the American landings at Nijmegen and to defend the "island" (the polder between the Nederrijn and Waal rivers), the 9th SS Panzer Division was to defend Arnhem. The 9th SS Panzer Division was in the midst of preparing to return to Germany and Harmel was in Berlin trying to secure more men and supplies for his unit. He was instantly ordered to return to Arnhem as his division began to prepare for battle. Obersturmbannführer Ludwig Spindler, commander of the 9th SS Armoured Artillery Regiment, quickly organised a small Kampfgruppe (battlegroup; Kampfgruppe Spindler). In the late afternoon, he was ordered to advance west to Oosterbeek and establish a blocking line to prevent the British from reaching Arnhem centre.

The 9th SS Division reconnaissance battalion, with 40 vehicles (Hauptsturmführer Viktor Gräbner) was ordered south to Nijmegen, crossing the Arnhem bridge at dusk. No units were ordered to secure the bridge at first. Kussin, the Arnhem Garrison commander, was killed by men of the 3rd Parachute Battalion as he sped towards his headquarters and his death led to a breakdown in the German command. It was not until late in the afternoon that the Reconnaissance Battalion of the 10th SS Panzer Division were ordered to secure the bridge. At the time of the landings, only the 16th SS Training Battalion camped in Wolfheze to oppose the Allied advance toward the bridges. The commander, Sepp Krafft, acted quickly to establish a screen west of Oosterbeek.

The reconnaissance squadron was ambushed by the northern flank of Krafft's blocking line and withdrew. The 1st and 3rd Parachute Battalions were also stopped by Krafft's defences and spent the rest of the day looking for a flank. The 3rd Parachute Battalion went south and halted in Oosterbeek for most of the night while 1st Parachute Battalion went further north, ran into Spindler's forces and was unable to reach the Arnhem–Ede road of Leopard route. Dobie decided to abandon his original plan and head towards the bridge to assist Frost; the battalion headed south into Oosterbeek overnight. Only the 2nd Parachute Battalion was largely unopposed, bypassing the defences that did not reach down as far as the river. They were slowed by cheering Dutch civilians and did not reach the bridges until late in the day. The railway bridge was blown by German engineers as the British approached it and the pontoon bridge was missing its central section. At dusk, the men of A Company under Major Digby Tatham-Warter observed Gräbner's force cross the bridge on their way to Nijmegen. Most of the battalion and various other supporting units, including two jeeps of Gough's squadron, four 6-pounder anti-tank guns, Brigade HQ (without Lathbury) and Royal Engineers (about 740 men) moved into the town centre as night fell.

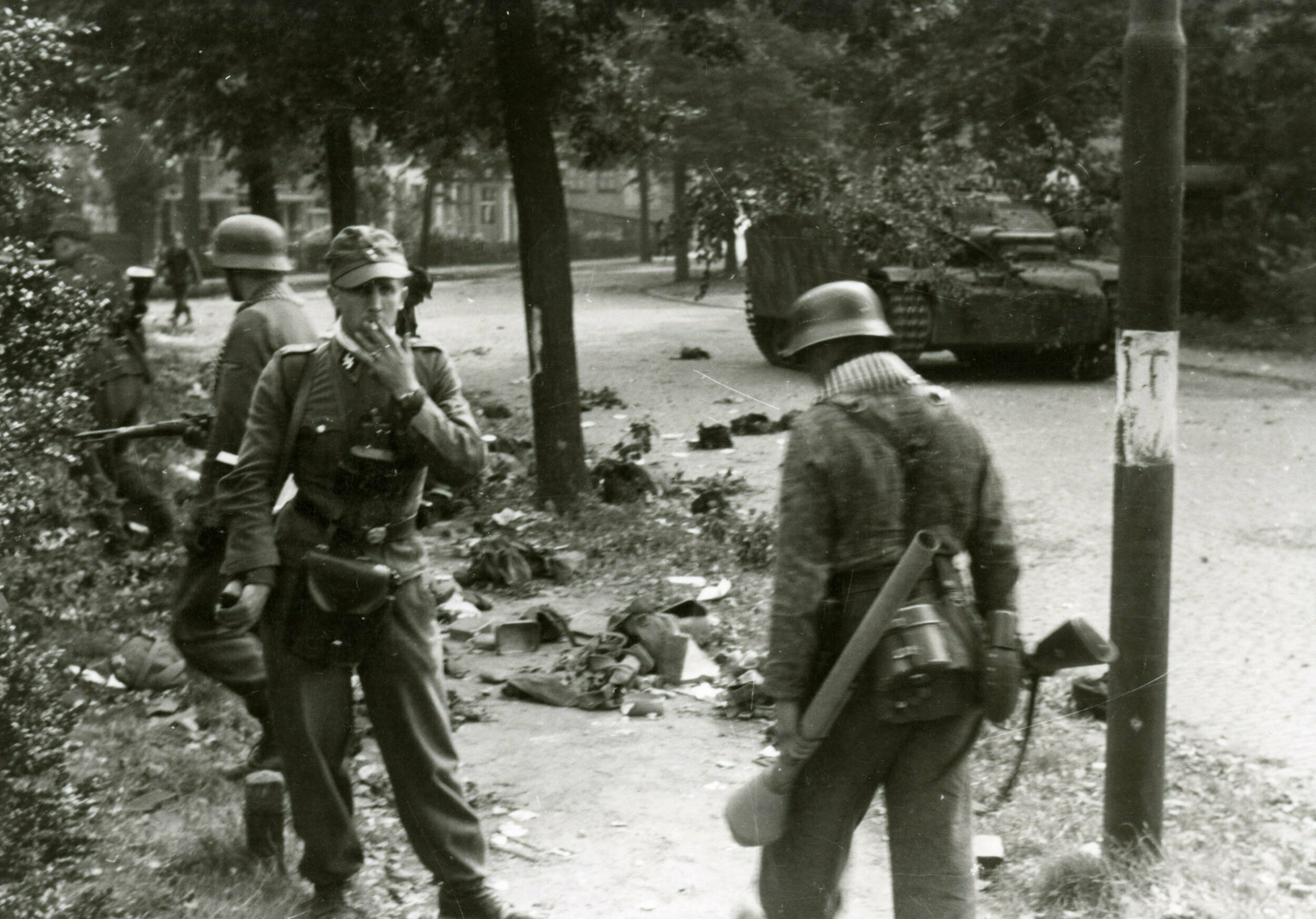
German soldiers search equipment left behind during the fighting on 17 September.

Lieutenant Colonel John Frost, commander of the 2nd Parachute Battalion of the 1st Parachute Brigade, had led a mixed group of about 740–750 lightly armed men who had landed near Oosterbeek and marched into Arnhem along the Rhine River route. While encountering few Germans and little opposition, the 2nd Battalion had been unable to secure its objectives along the way. The railway bridge at Oosterbeek was blown up by the Germans when the first British paratroops tried to rush across and seize it. The Germans had moved the Old Ship bridge to the south bank. The battalion reached the main road bridge in Arnhem, capturing the northern end but was unable to secure the southern end from the German defenders. The 2nd Parachute Battalion were able to consolidate their position and quickly repulsed the 10th SS Reconnaissance Battalion and other German units when they arrived to secure the bridge.

The Allied advance was severely hampered by poor communications. The paratroopers' radio sets' range was instantly limited by the wooded terrain and as the battalions advanced they lost contact with Divisional HQ at the landing zones. For the next nine days, radio communication within the division, with Browning's HQ at Nijmegen, with XXX Corps and with the United Kingdom was intermittent and unreliable, severely hampering the British units. Carrier pigeons were used to make contact with Britain. Partly as a consequence of the radio failure, Urquhart followed the 1st Parachute Brigade to make contact with Lathbury. At the Brigade HQ on Lion route, Major Hibbert, who was still en route to the bridge, told him that Lathbury was visiting the 3rd Battalion. Urquhart followed Lathbury there but then was trapped and did not return to Divisional HQ for two days.

=== Day 2 – Monday 18 September ===
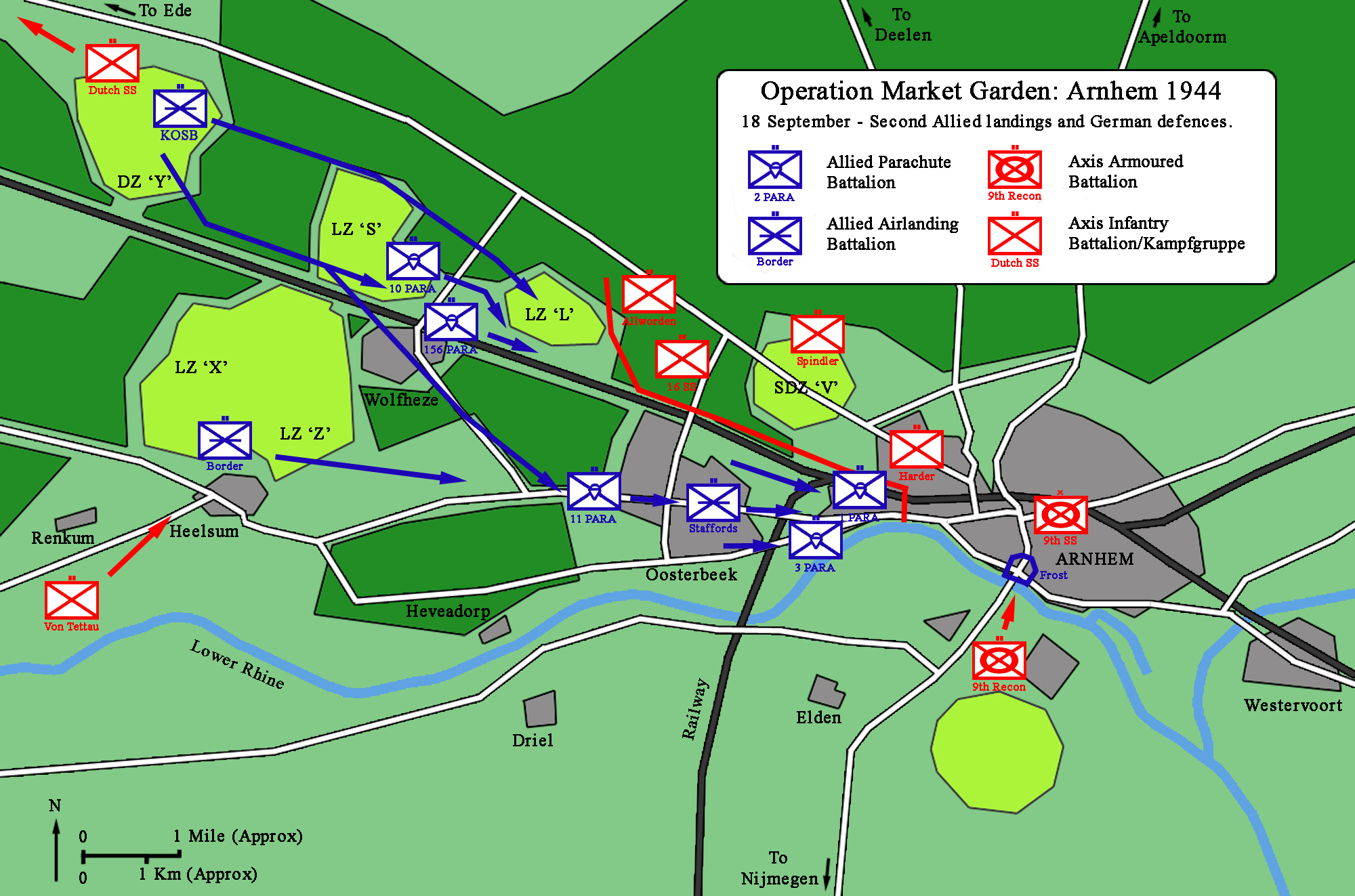
The 2nd lift advances into Arnhem where it encounters the German blocking line, 18 September.

The 9th SS Panzer Division continued to reinforce the German blocking line. Kampfgruppe Krafft withdrew overnight and joined Kampfgruppe Spindler, coming under his command. Kampfgruppe Spindler grew as men and units arrived and he split it into battle groups Kampfgruppe Allworden and Kampfgruppe Harder. The defensive line blocked the western side of Arnhem and had closed the gap exploited by Frost along the river the previous evening.

Overnight, the 1st and 3rd Parachute Battalions had skirted as far south as Lion route, followed by the 2nd Parachute Battalion hoping to reach Arnhem centre. The battalions approached the German line on the outskirts of the town before light and for several hours attempted to fight through the German positions. The Kampfgruppen, being continually reinforced, was too strong to penetrate and by 10:00 the British advance had stopped. The paratroopers launched a better coordinated attack in the afternoon but it too was repulsed.

Urquhart tried to return to his divisional headquarters at Oosterbeek but was cut off by German troops. He and two other officers took shelter in a Dutch family's loft. Lathbury was wounded and also went into hiding. At the road bridge, troops of the 9th SS Panzer Division surrounded the 2nd Battalion and cut them off from the rest of the division. At around 09:00, the 9th SS Reconnaissance Battalion headed back to Arnhem from south of the river, not being needed at Nijmegen. The Reconnaissance Battalion tried to rush the bridge. The paratroopers repulsed the battalion, destroying or knocking out twelve of the 22 armoured vehicles and killing over 70 men, including Gräbner. Attacks on the British at the Arnhem bridge continued for the rest of the day but the British held on.

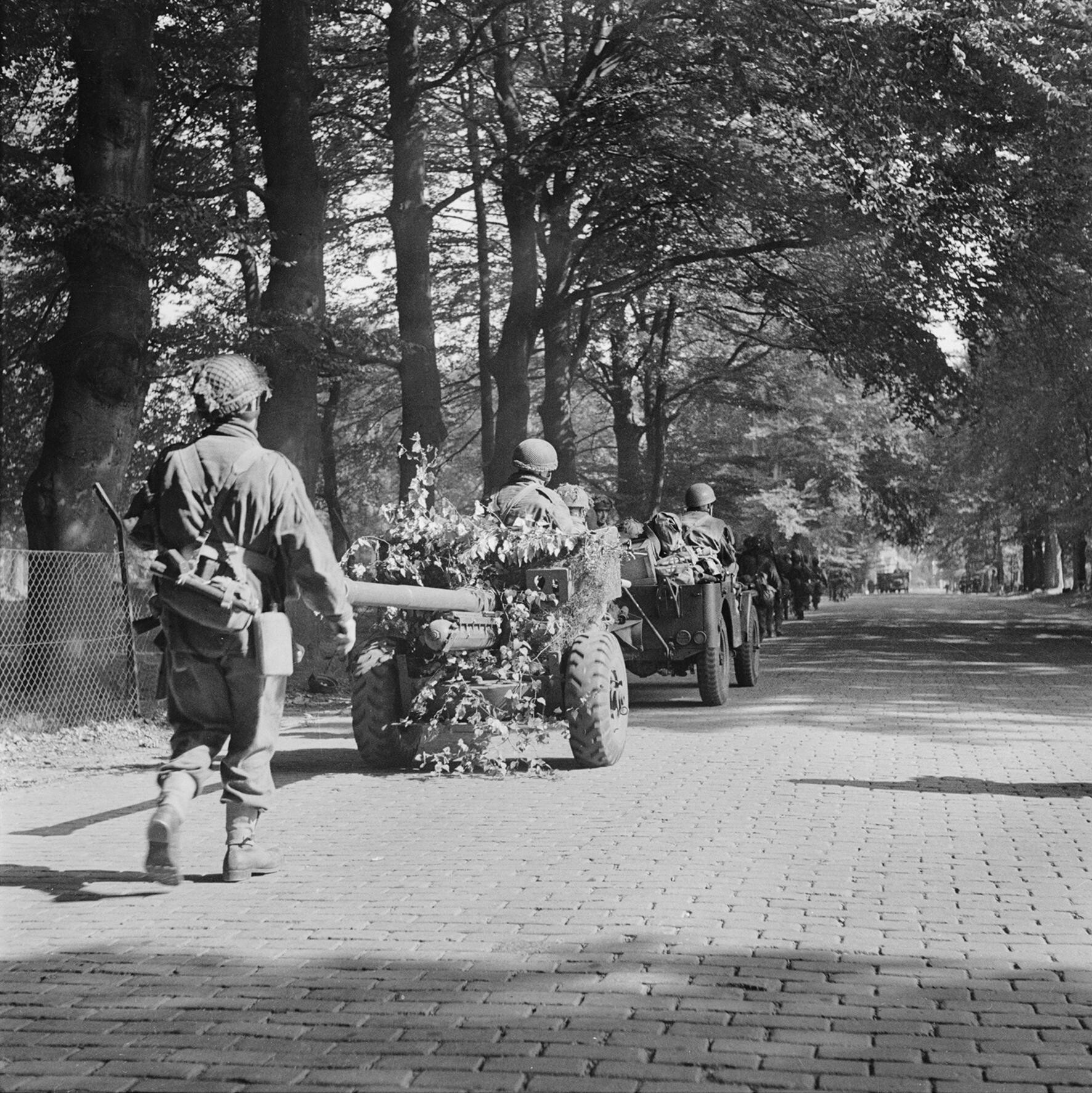
Men of the 2nd Battalion, South Staffordshire Regiment, of the 1st Airlanding Brigade, advance toward Arnhem, towing a 6-pounder anti-tank gun with them, 18 September.

At the landing zones, the Chief of Staff, Lieutenant Colonel Charles Mackenzie, told Hicks that, in Urquhart's and Lathbury's absence, he was acting divisional commander. Mackenzie also advised him to send the South Staffords (not complete and waiting for the rest of its men in the second lift) to help with the advance to the bridge. The South Staffords departed in the morning and joined the 1st Parachute Battalion in the late afternoon.

German forces probed the 1st Airlanding Brigade defences in the morning. Units of Kampfgruppe von Tettau attacked the Borderers positions. Men of the SS NCO school overran Renkum and Kriegsmarine troops engaged the British all day as they withdrew. Skirmishing took place at LZ 'X' but did not seriously hamper the glider landing there. At DZ 'Y', the Dutch SS Wach Battalion attacked the King's Own Scottish Borderers, threatening to hamper the arrival of the second lift. The communications breakdown meant that it was impossible to warn the aircraft and the division could not know that the second lift had been delayed by fog in England. The arrival of the 4th Parachute Brigade (Brigadier Hackett) and more troops of artillery was hours overdue. When the parachutists did arrive after 15:00, they dropped under fire. Several were killed as aircraft and parachutists were shot down and the heath-land they were landing on burned. The brigade overwhelmed the Dutch SS, that were captured in droves.

The British units assembled with only slight casualties but the circumstances at Arnhem changed their roles after arrival. The 11th Parachute Battalion and the rest of the South Staffords were immediately despatched to Arnhem to join the attempt to break through to the bridge, where they joined the 1st and 3rd Parachute Battalions after dark. Hicks' decision to send the 11th Parachute Battalion to Arnhem (weakening the 4th Parachute Brigade), dismayed Hackett, who remonstrated with Hicks to no avail. He was given command of the King's Own Scottish Borderers, who were moving toward LZ 'L' to secure it for the landing on Tuesday.

The 10th Parachute Battalion and the 156th Parachute Battalion moved north of the railway line to take up their defensive positions north-west of Arnhem. The leading elements of the 156th Parachute Battalion made contact with the main 9th SS Panzer Division blocking line after dark and withdrew for the night. Shortly after the second lift arrived, the first supply drop was made onto LZ 'L'. Although most supplies arrived, paratroopers retrieved only a small amount as the area was not under British control. Lack of radio communication meant the RAF had not been told of this.

=== Day 3 – Tuesday 19 September ===
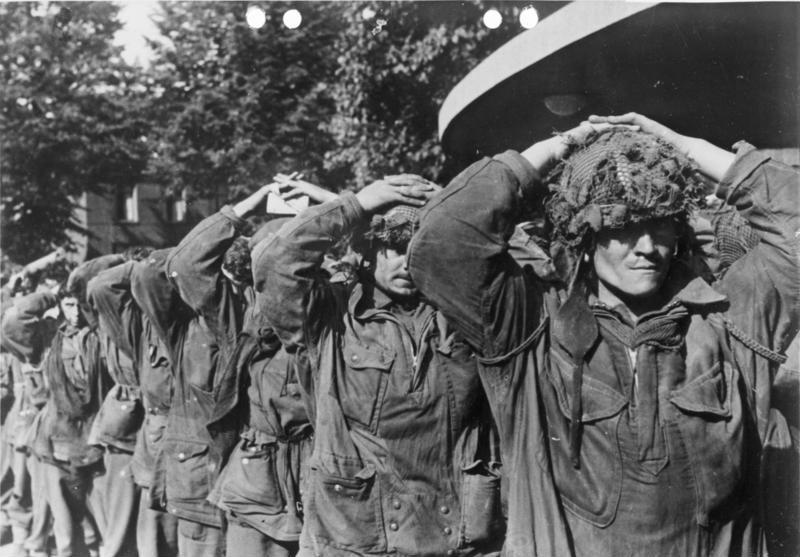
British prisoners-of-war. The Germans took scores of prisoners after the morning's fighting on 19 September.

With the South Staffords and 11th Parachute Battalion arriving at the positions of the 1st and 3rd Parachute Battalions on the western outskirts of Arnhem, the British hoped to have sufficient troops to break through to Frost's position at the bridge. Lieutenant Colonel Dobie, the commander of the 1st Parachute Battalion, planned to attack before first light, but an erroneous report suggesting that the bridge had fallen led to the attack being cancelled. By the time the report was corrected, first light was due but with reinforcement at the bridge the priority, the attack had to proceed. The advance began on a narrow front between the railway line to the north and the river to the south. The 1st Parachute Battalion led, supported by remnants of the 3rd Parachute Battalion, with the 2nd South Staffordshires on the left flank and the 11th Parachute Battalion following behind. As soon as it became light, the 1st Parachute Battalion was spotted and halted by fire from the main German defensive line. Trapped in open ground and under heavy fire from three sides, the 1st Parachute Battalion disintegrated and what remained of the 3rd Parachute Battalion fell back.

The 2nd South Staffordshires were similarly cut off and save for about 150 men, overcome by midday. The 11th Parachute Battalion was overwhelmed in exposed positions while attempting to capture high ground to the north. The South Staffords similarly attempted to secure high ground but were repulsed. With no hope of breaking through, the 500 remaining men of these four battalions retreated westwards in the direction of the main force, 3.1 mi (5 km) away in Oosterbeek. As they approached Oosterbeek, they were met by Lieutenant Colonel Sheriff Thompson, of the 1st Airlanding Light Artillery Regiment, who formed most of the men into a defensive screen under Major Robert Cain 0.5 mi (0.80 km) forward of his artillery positions. The battle gave Urquhart the opportunity to escape from his hiding place, and he was able to return to the Divisional HQ at the Hotel Hartenstein in Oosterbeek, where for the first time he was able to learn the extent of the German forces facing them. In Britain, ground fog again frustrated reinforcement. Thirty-five gliders of the 3rd lift carrying the Polish glider-borne elements were delayed in taking off and the parachute brigade failed to take off at all.

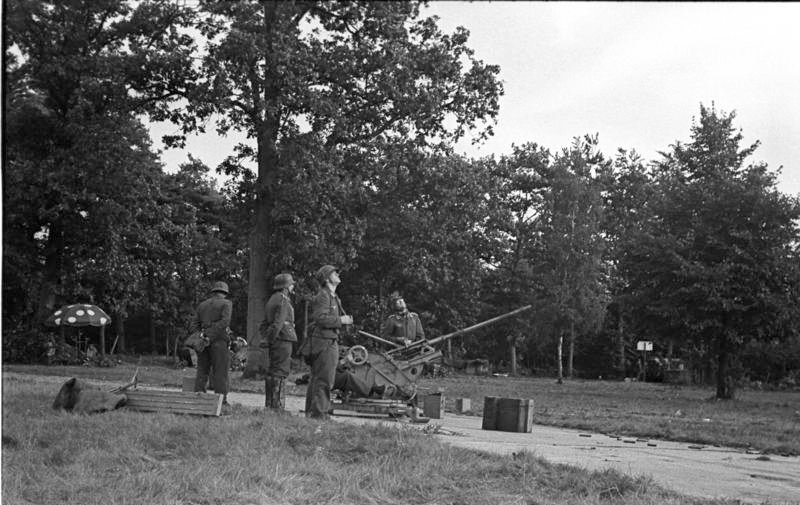
A German 20 mm Flak gun awaits the arrival of supply aircraft during the battle.

North of the railway line, the 156th and 10th Parachute Battalions tried to seize the high ground in the woods north of Oosterbeek. The advance was slow and by early afternoon they had not advanced any further than their original positions. Urquhart, realising the need to go on to the defensive and prevent the two battalions being cut off north of the railway, ordered them to fall back to Wolfheze and Oosterbeek. Making a fighting withdrawal with the Germans of Kampfgruppe Krafft closely pursuing them, the units fell back across LZ 'L', defended by the King's Own Scottish Borderers, who were awaiting the arrival of the glider-borne elements of the Polish Parachute Brigade. Fighting began as the gliders arrived in the middle of the retreat and Polish losses were severe. Of the eight 6-pounder guns that arrived, only three were unloaded and the rest were abandoned to the Germans. All four Allied units streamed south and west toward the road crossings over the steep railway cutting at Oosterbeek and Wolfheze and gathered in ad hoc units in the woods on the south side, where most of them spent the night. Some German units followed them across the railway and an SS battalion reached Wolfheze but stopped when it was strafed by the Luftwaffe.

In the afternoon, the RAF flew its first big supply mission, with 164 aircraft carrying 390 short tons (350 t) of supplies. The Germans anticipated the flight and moved five flak batteries into the area; as the RAF came into view, they shot down ten aircraft. Despite the bravery of the pilots (Flight Lieutenant David Lord received the Victoria Cross posthumously), the Airborne forces only recovered 31 short tons (28 t) of supplies. The dropzone, DZ 'V', was still in German hands (the British would never reach this zone during the battle) and no message had reached Britain to explain this. At the bridge, Frost held on, but without supplies or reinforcements, the position was becoming precarious. The Germans began systematically to destroy the houses the British were in, using tanks, artillery and mortars. The Luftwaffe was able to make strafing runs on the British-occupied houses.

=== Day 4 – Wednesday 20 September ===
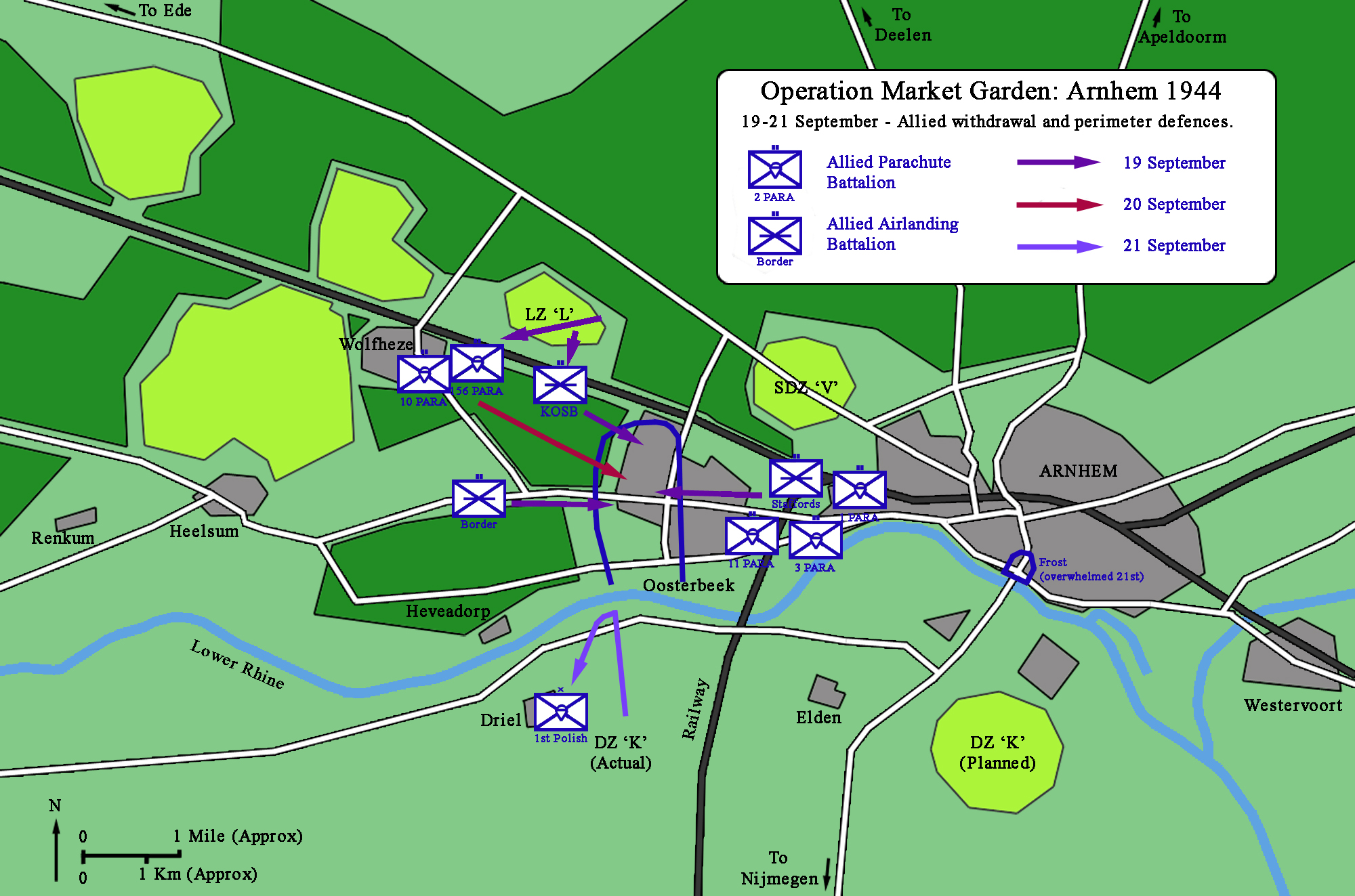
The British battalions break off their engagements and withdraw into the Oosterbeek perimeter, 19–21 September.

By now, the 1st Airborne Division was too weak to attempt to reach Frost at the bridge. Eight of the nine infantry battalions had been badly mauled or scattered and only the 1st Battalion, The Border Regiment remained as a unit. That morning, Urquhart made the difficult decision to abandon the 2nd Parachute Battalion and ordered all of the remaining units of the 1st Airborne Division to retreat to Oosterbeek. By forming a defensive perimeter around Oosterbeek and securing the Driel ferry crossing, Urquhart hoped to hold out until XXX Corps could reach them and establish a new bridgehead over the Rhine.

The eastern side of this new perimeter was fairly stable after the previous day's retreat from Arnhem, with numerous ad hoc units under company commanders defending the approaches to Oosterbeek. Major Richard Lonsdale had taken command of the outlying units and their positions survived German attacks, before falling back to the main divisional perimeter. This sector was later named Lonsdale Force and would remain the main line of defence on the south-eastern perimeter. The Border Regiment held most of the western edge of the town, with scattered units filling the gaps to the north. As more units fell back to the new defensive area, they were reorganised to establish a thumb-shaped position using the Nederrijn as its southern base. The mixed units at Wolfheze began to fall back in the morning, but several were surrounded and captured, including the 130 men of B Company 7th KOSB. One hundred and fifty men of 156th Parachute Battalion, led by Hackett, were pinned down and took cover in a hollow some 1,300 ft (400 m) west of the Oosterbeek perimeter. The men broke out of the hollow in the late afternoon and approximately 90 of them made it to the Border Regiment's positions.

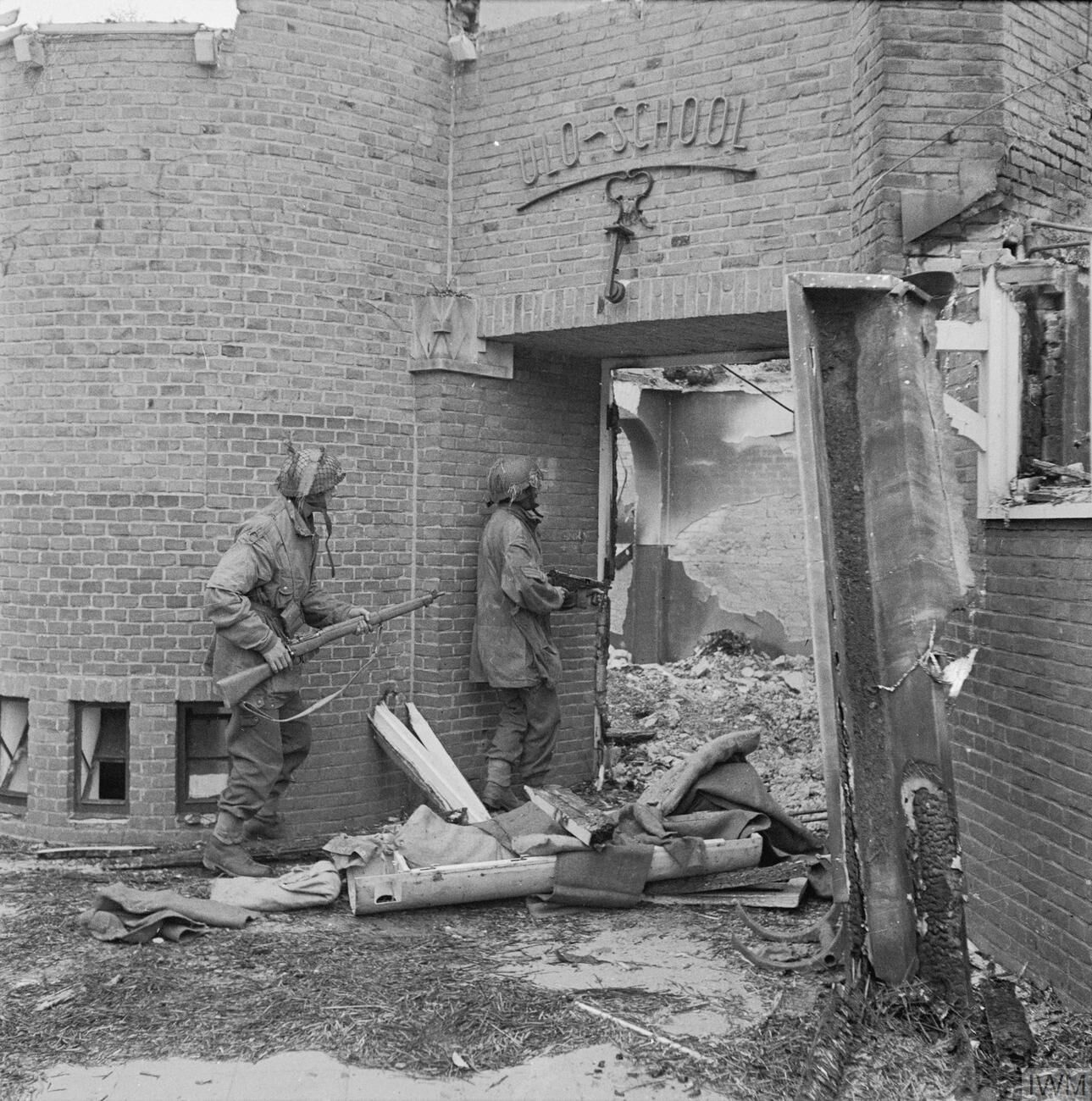
Men of the Glider Pilot Regiment search for snipers, 20 September.

The afternoon's supply drop went little better than the drop previous day. A message had reached Britain to arrange a new dropping zone near the Hotel Hartenstein, some aircraft flew to LZ 'Z' where their supplies fell into German hands. At Oosterbeek, the Germans had used British marker panels and flares to attract the aircraft to their positions and the aircraft were unable to tell the difference. Ten of the 164 aircraft involved were shot down around Arnhem and only 13 per cent of the supplies reached British hands.

At the bridge, Frost was finally able to make radio contact with Urquhart and was given the difficult news that reinforcement was doubtful. Shortly afterwards, at about 13:30, Frost was injured in the legs by a mortar bomb, and command passed to Major Gough. Despite their stubborn defence of the few buildings they still held, by late afternoon the British position was becoming untenable. When fire took hold of many of the buildings in which the wounded were being treated, a two-hour truce was organised in the late afternoon and the wounded (including Frost) were taken into captivity. Overnight, a few units managed to hold out for a little longer and several groups tried to break out toward the Oosterbeek perimeter, although almost all of them, including Major Hibbert, were captured. By 05:00 on Thursday morning, resistance at the bridge had ceased. In later years, Walter Harzer claimed that, during the final hours of fighting, his men intercepted a radio message sent from the bridge that ended with the sentences: "Out of ammunition. God Save the King".

Around midnight, Captain Heggie's detachment of the 9th Field Company RE abandoned the northern terminal of the Driel ferry after a German attack inflicted 50% casualties. An officer hoping to use the ferry to bring ammunition to Frost via the south bank of the river found that the ferry was listing in the river and the cable winding mechanism was jammed beyond repair. Division HQ learned of the loss of the ferry at 03:40.

=== Day 5 – Thursday 21 September ===
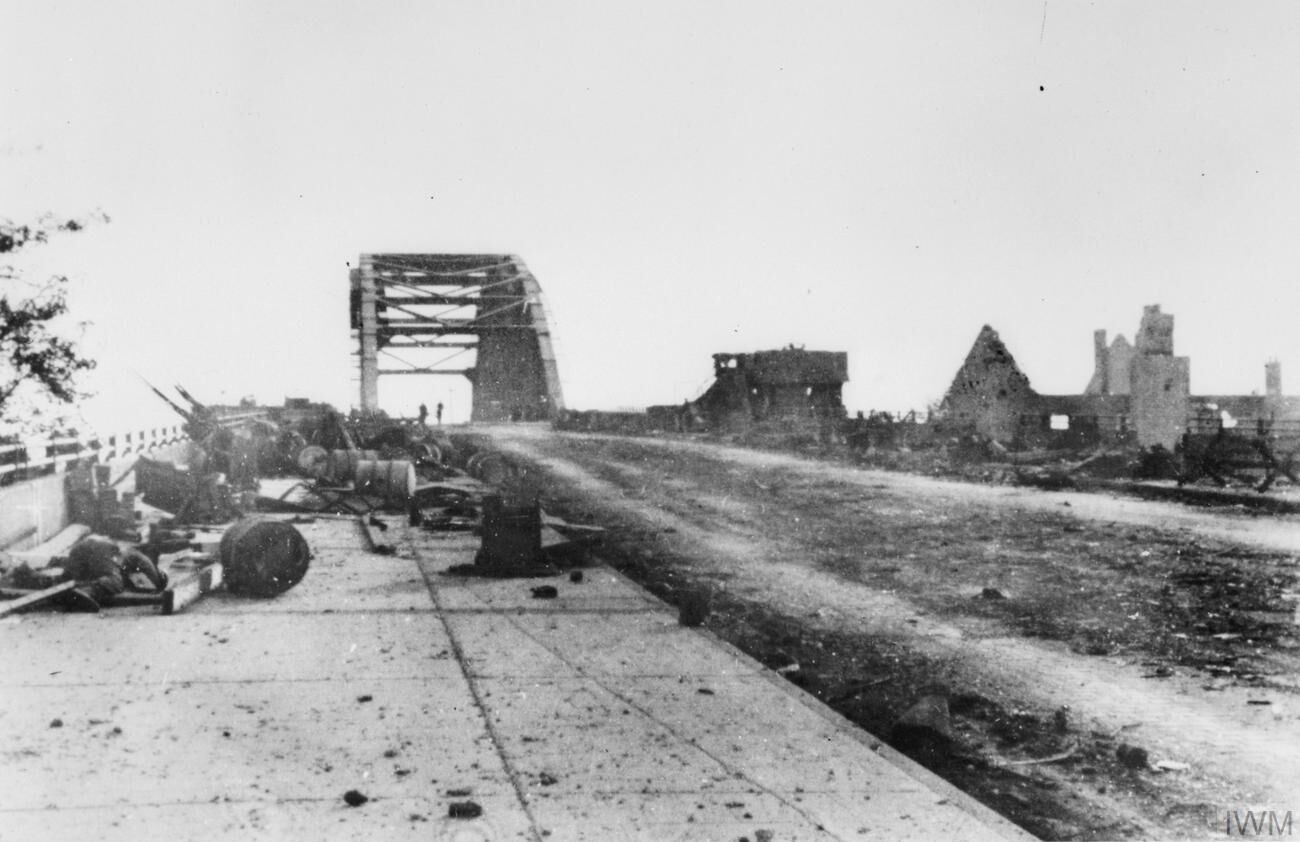
The Arnhem Bridge after Frost's force had been overrun and the road cleared. Notice the destroyed buildings on the right.

Throughout the morning, the Germans mopped up British survivors and stragglers hiding around Arnhem bridge. It took several hours to clear the bridge of debris to allow German armour to cross and reinforce Nijmegen. The British had held the bridge for long enough for the 82nd Airborne Division and the Guards Armoured Division to capture the Nijmegen bridge. With the resistance at the bridge at an end, the Germans had more troops available for the Oosterbeek engagement, although this changed suddenly in the afternoon.

Delayed by weather, the 1st (Polish) Parachute Brigade (Stanisław Sosabowski) were finally able to take off; 114 C-47s took off but 41 aircraft turned back after Troop Carrier Command decided the worsening weather would make landing dangerous if the aircraft were away too long. The remainder pressed on because they had the wrong codes and could not decipher the recall signals. One of the few messages to get out of Arnhem warned the Poles that DZ 'K' was not secure and to land instead on the polder east of Driel, where they should secure the Heveadorp ferry on the south bank of the Rhine. The Poles dropped under fire shortly after 17:00 and suffered casualties but assembled in good order. 1003 men had arrived and casualties during the drop and later that day amounted to five killed and 25 wounded. Advancing to the river bank, they discovered that the ferry was gone; the ferryman had sunk it to deny its use to the Germans. The arrival of the Poles relieved the pressure on the British, as the Germans sent forces south of the Rhine. Fearing an attack on the southern end of the road bridge or the Nijmegen road, III Battalion/SS Grenadier Regiment Landstorm Nederland, Machine Gun Battalion 47, and Kampfgruppen Schoerken, Kauer, and Köhnken headed across the river overnight.

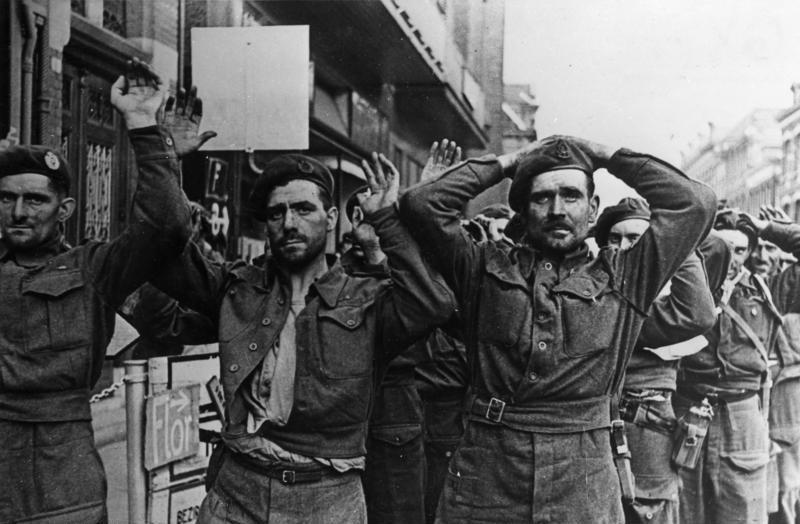
British prisoners at Arnhem Bridge. They are unshaven after four days of fighting – water was scarce during the battle.

At Oosterbeek, the defensive positions were consolidated and organised into two zones. Hicks commanded the western and northern sides of the perimeter and Hackett, after some rest, the east side. The perimeter was not a line but a collection of defensive pockets in houses and foxholes around the centre of Oosterbeek, with the divisional headquarters at the Hotel Hartenstein at its centre. The perimeter was roughly 3 mi (4.8 km) round and was defended by about 3,600 men.

Battalion Wossowski of the Hermann Göring Training and Replacement Regiment, with four captured French tanks from 224th Panzer Company, attacked the Border positions on the west side near the Rhine, forcing them to abandon the Westerbouwing Heights overlooking the Driel ferry. This allowed the Germans to observe and interdict the segment of river adjacent to the perimeter. The British made contact with the 64th Medium Regiment, RA of XXX Corps, which bombarded the German positions around the perimeter. The radio link to the regiment was also used as the main line of communication to XXX Corps and I Airborne Corps. So important was the 64 Medium Regiment that afterwards Urquhart lobbied (unsuccessfully) for the regiment to be able to wear the airborne Pegasus badge on their uniforms.

The British had seen the Polish drop but were unable to make wireless contact and Private Ernest Archer swam the Rhine with a message. The British planned to supply rafts for a river crossing that night, as the Poles were desperately needed on the northern bank. The Poles waited on the southern bank, but by 03:00 no rafts had arrived and they withdrew to Driel to take up defensive positions.

=== Day 6 – Friday 22 September ===
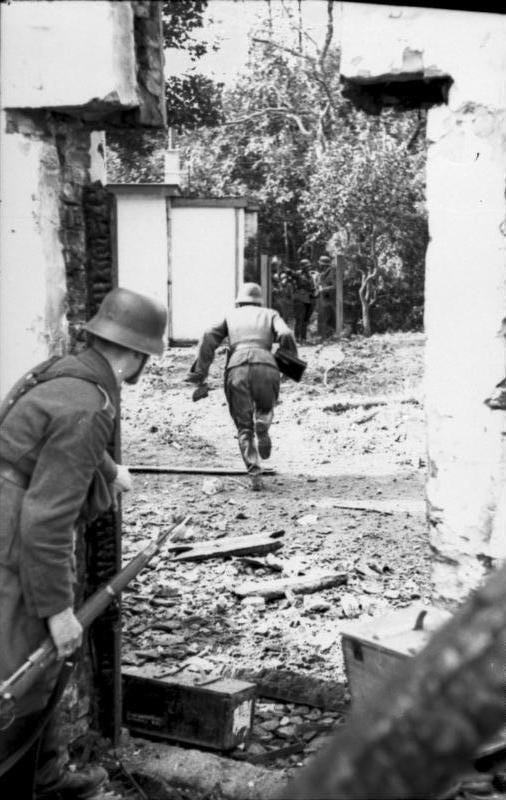
German forces in Oosterbeek. There was bitter house-to-house fighting around the perimeter.

Overnight, the Germans south of the river formed a blocking line along the railway, linking up with 10th SS to the south and screening the road bridge from the Poles. The Polish were well dug in at Driel, however, and German armour was unable to manoeuvre off of the main roads to attack them. Hopes were raised when three armoured cars of XXX Corps' 2nd Household Cavalry Regiment managed to skirt the German defences on the island and link up with Sosabowski's force. These were followed after dark by tanks of the 4th/7th Royal Dragoon Guards and infantry of the 5th Battalion Duke of Cornwall's Light Infantry. Behind them, the rest of the 43rd Wessex Division was making its way up a narrow corridor.

In Oosterbeek, heavy fighting continued around the perimeter. Intense shelling and snipers increased the number of casualties at the aid posts in the hotels and houses of the town. Bittrich ordered that the attacks be stepped up and the British bridgehead north of the Rhine destroyed, and at 09:00 the major attacks began with the various Kampfgruppen of 9th SS attacking from the east and Kampfgruppe von Tettau's units from the west. They made only small gains, but these attacks were followed by simultaneous attacks in the afternoon when the Germans made determined moves on the northern and eastern ends. To the north, they succeeded in briefly forcing back the King's Own Scottish Borderers, before the latter counterattacked and retook their positions. Urquhart realised the futility of holding the tactically unimportant tip however and ordered the units in the north to fall back and defend a shorter line. To the east, the remains of 10th Parachute Battalion were nearly annihilated in their small position on the main Arnhem road, but the Germans failed to gain any significant ground.

Two of Urquhart's staff officers swam the Rhine during the day and made contact with Sosabowski's HQ. It was arranged that six rubber boats should be supplied on the northern bank to enable the Poles to cross the river and come into the Oosterbeek perimeter. That night, the plan was put into operation, but the cable designed to run the boats across broke and the small oars were not enough to paddle across the fast-flowing river. Only 55 Poles made it across before light and only 35 of these made it into the perimeter.

=== Day 7 – Saturday 23 September ===
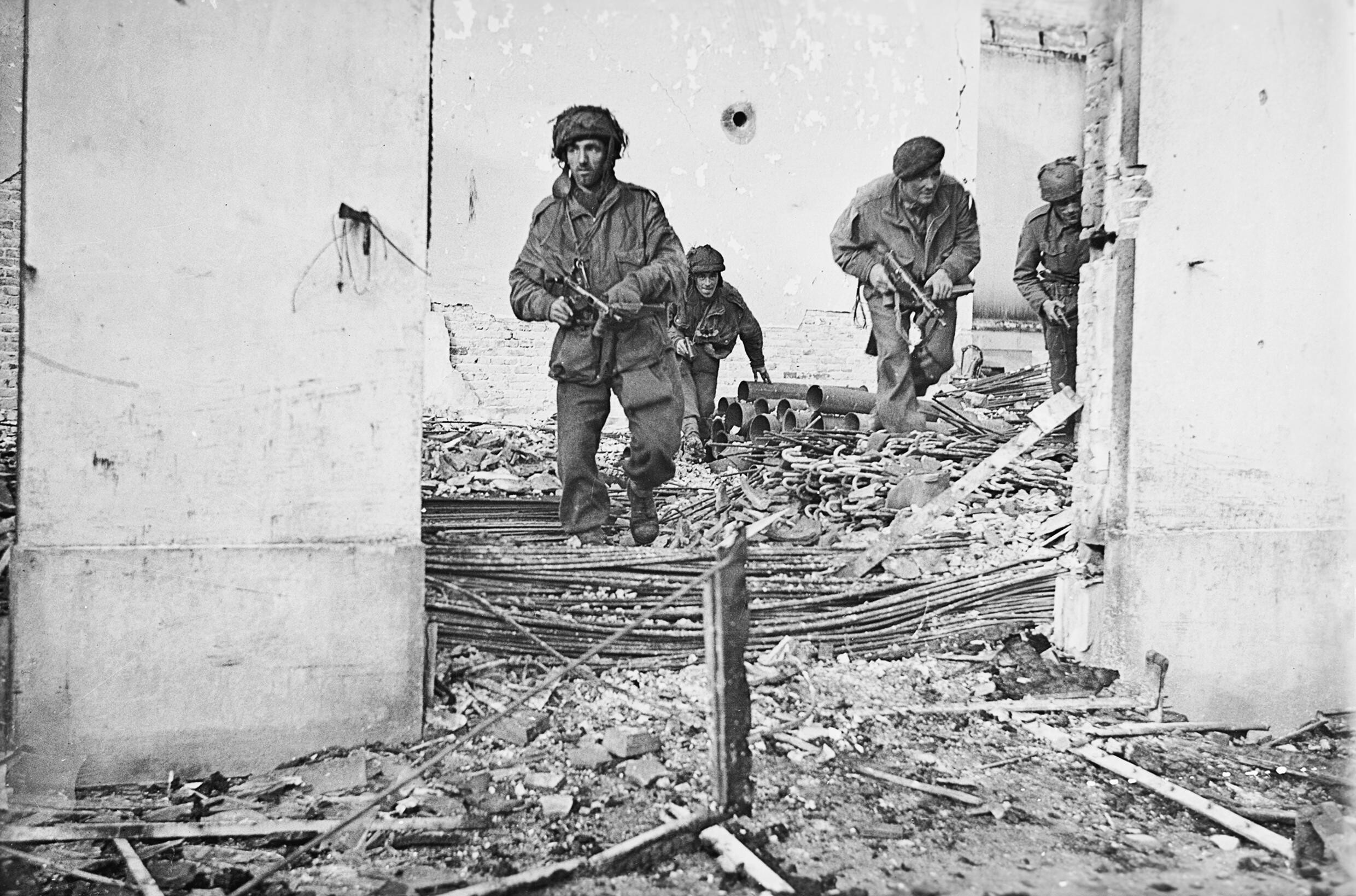
British forces move through a ruined building in Oosterbeek.

Spindler was ordered to switch his attacks further south to try to force the British away from the river, isolating the British from any hope of reinforcement and allowing them to be destroyed. Despite their best efforts, however, they were unsuccessful, although the constant artillery and assaults continued to wear the British defences down further.

A break in the weather allowed the RAF to finally fly combat missions against the German forces surrounding Urquhart's men. Hawker Typhoons and Republic P-47 Thunderbolts strafed German positions throughout the day and occasionally duelled with the Luftwaffe over the battlefield. The RAF attempted their final resupply flight from Britain on the Saturday afternoon, but lost eight planes for little gain to the airborne troops. Some small resupply efforts would be made from Allied airfields in Europe over the next two days but to little effect.

South of the river, the Poles prepared for another crossing. That night, they awaited the arrival of assault boats from XXX Corps, but these did not arrive until after midnight, and many were without oars. The crossings started at 03:00, with fire support from the 43rd Wessex Division. Through the remaining hours of darkness, only 153 men were able to cross – less than ¼ of the hoped for reinforcement.

=== Day 8 – Sunday 24 September ===
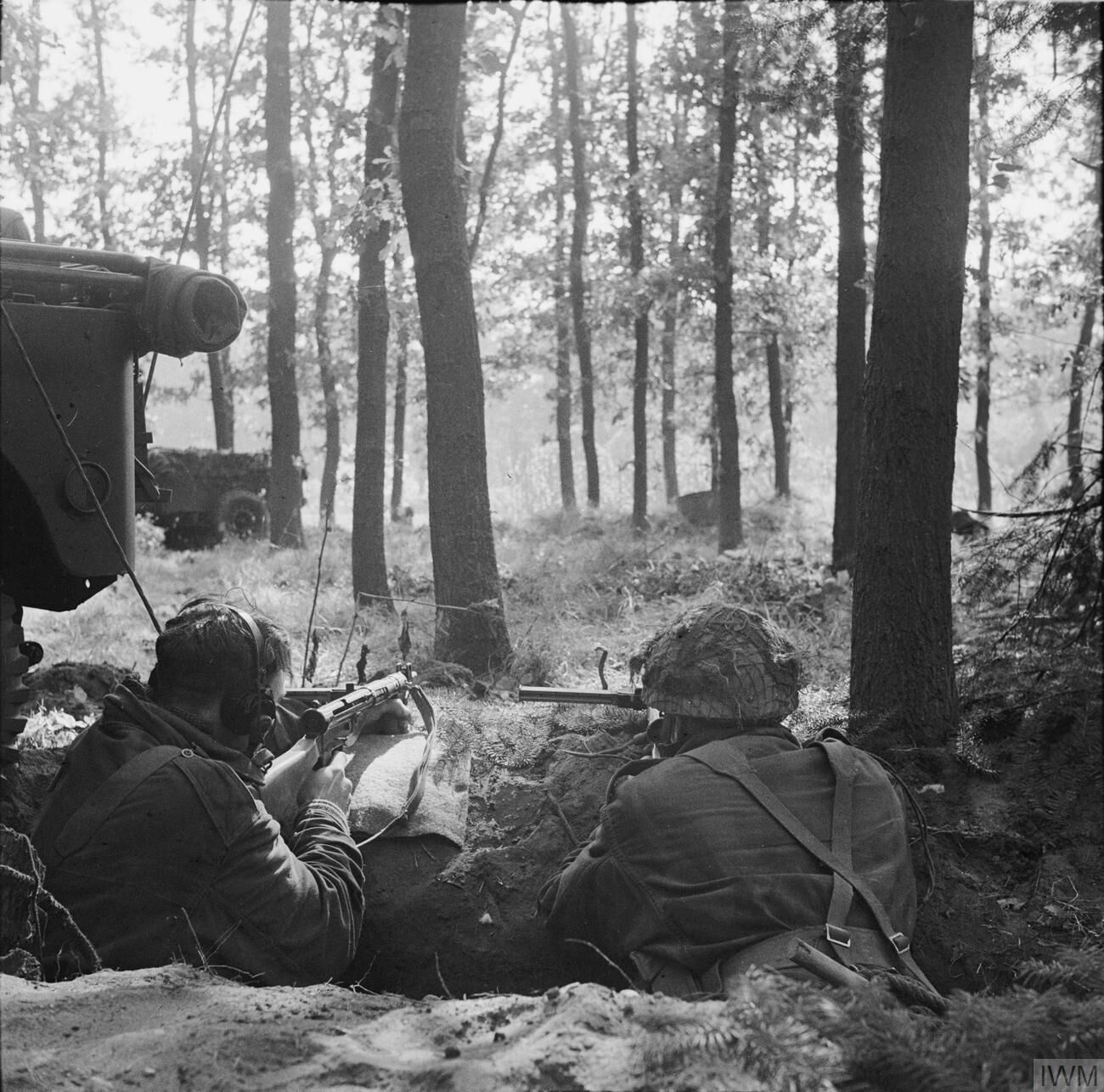
Two troopers dug in near Oosterbeek on 18 September, showing the woodland fought in on the western side of the British perimeter.

In the morning, Horrocks visited the Polish positions at Driel to see the front for himself. Later, he held a conference attended by Browning, Major-General Ivor Thomas of the 43rd (Wessex) Division and Sosabowski at Valburg. In a controversial meeting in which Sosabowski was politically outmanoeuvred, it was decided that another crossing would be attempted that night. When the Germans cut the narrow supply road near Koevering south of Nijmegen later that day, it seems that Horrocks realised the futility of the situation and plans were drawn up to withdraw the 1st Airborne Division.

In Oosterbeek, the situation was desperate; Hackett was wounded in the morning and had to give up the eastern command. The RAF attempted some close support around the perimeter which just held but shelling and sniping increased casualties by the hour. The aid stations were occupied by 2,000 men, British, German and Dutch civilian casualties. Because many aid posts were in the front line, in homes taken over earlier in the battle, the odd situation was created where casualties were evacuated forward rather than rearwards. Without evacuation, the wounded were often injured again and some posts changed hands between the British and Germans several times as the perimeter was fought over.

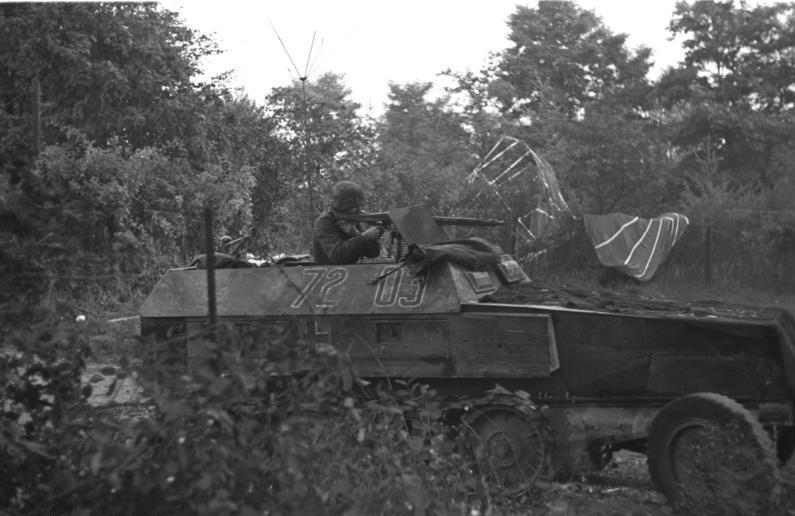
A 9th SS Sd.Kfz. 250 half-track in action at Oosterbeek. Notice the supply parachute in the background.

During the fighting around Oosterbeek, there had been short, local truces around the aid posts to allow the wounded to reach them, but on Sunday Colonel Graeme Warrack – the senior medical officer – asked Urquhart permission to arrange a truce. Warrack was taken to see Bittrich who agreed and offered Warrack as many supplies as he could carry. Between 15:00 and 17:00, a general ceasefire began around the perimeter and about 450 stretcher cases and walking wounded were evacuated from the perimeter, the Germans using jeeps and ambulances to take serious cases straight to Saint Elisabeth Hospital in Arnhem where British, German and Dutch medical staff worked together.

That night, the Allies on the south side of the river attempted another crossing. The plan called for 4th Battalion, the Dorset Regiment and the 1st Polish Parachute Battalion to cross at 22:00 using boats and DUKWs. Sosabowski thought he should have been given the courtesy of selecting which battalion and was annoyed by Thomas's micromanagement. He also thought the crossing site was too dangerous and the force too small to make a difference. He instead proposed a division-scale crossing west of the Germans but was overruled. The boats for the 4th Dorsets were carried by five trucks. Two trucks ran off the road and got stuck in ditches, while two more took a wrong turn at Valburg and drove into the German lines at Elst. The truck that did arrive did not have any paddles. The Poles were therefore told to give their three boats to the 43rd Division and only the 4th Dorsets would cross. The late arrival of the boats delayed the crossing until 01:00. The shortage of paddles, strong current, and German machine gun and mortar fire scattered the boats and caused many to land too far downstream. Of the 315 men who embarked, 13 died and about 200 were captured. Only a handful reached the British lines on the other side. Of the six DUKWs loaded with supplies, three either did not arrive or couldn't drive down the steep banks. The other three crossed the river but were carried 1000 yards downstream of the perimeter and got stuck in the mud, delivering the supplies to the Germans.

=== Day 9 – Monday 25 September ===
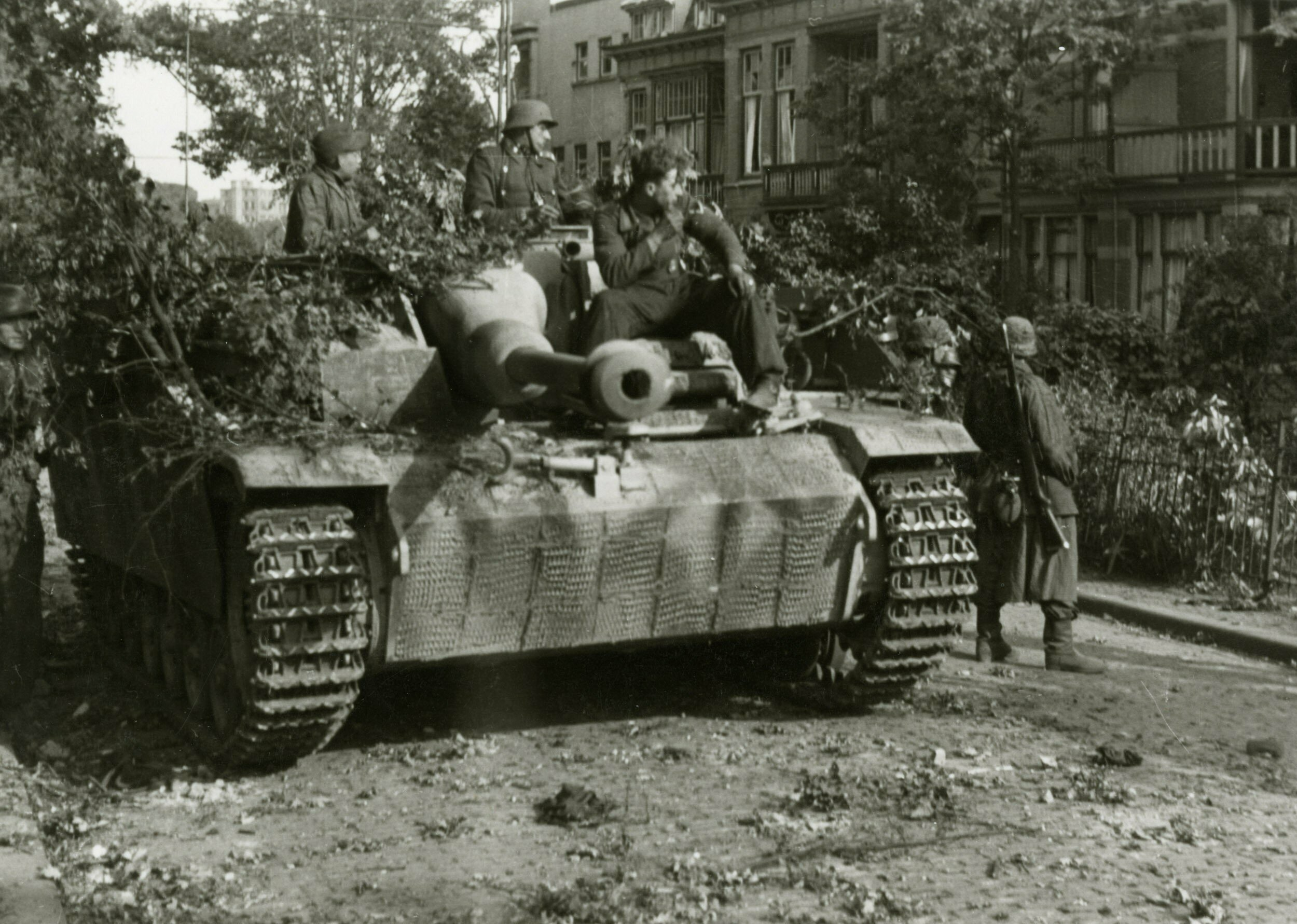
A German StuG III assault gun at Arnhem.

During the night, a copy of the withdrawal plan was sent across the river to Urquhart. Despite the obviously frustrating content, Urquhart knew there was little other choice. He radioed Thomas at 08:00 and agreed to the plan, provided it went ahead that night. The Airborne forces would need to endure another day in their perimeter. More men were evacuated from the aid posts throughout the day, but there was no official truce and this was sometimes done under fire. At 10:00, the Germans began their most successful assault on the perimeter, attacking the south-eastern end with infantry supported by newly arrived Tiger tanks. This assault pushed through the defenders' outer lines and threatened to isolate the bulk of the division from the river. Strong counter-attacks from the defenders and concentrated shellfire from south of the river eventually repulsed the Germans.

Urquhart made his withdrawal plan on the model used in the evacuation of Gallipoli during the First World War. The northernmost units would fall back first, moving through the more southerly groups, who would then follow behind. The glider pilots would organise the routes to the river and the operation would be covered by an intense artillery bombardment from XXX Corps. South of the river, the evacuation was organised and staffed by men of the 43rd (Wessex) divisional engineers and Royal Canadian Engineers, using rafts and storm boats. To keep the operation secret, the plan was not announced until the afternoon and some men (mainly wounded) would remain to provide covering fire through the night. Men were ordered to muffle their boots and weapons to help them bypass German incursions into the perimeter. Some men took the opportunity to shave before withdrawing, providing quite a morale boost.

By 21:00, heavy rain had begun to fall, which helped disguise the withdrawal. The bombardment commenced and the units began to fall back to the river. Half of the engineers' boats were too far west to be used (the 43rd (Wessex) Division mistakenly believing the crossing points used by the Dorsets the previous night were in British hands), slowing the evacuation. The Germans shelled the withdrawal, believing it to be a supply attempt. At 05:00, the operation was ended lest the coming light enable the Germans to fire onto the boats more accurately. A total of 2,163 Airborne men, 160 Poles, 75 Dorsets and several dozen other men were evacuated, but about 300 men were left behind on the northern bank when the operation was stopped, and 95 men were killed overnight during the evacuation.

During the morning of 26 September, the Germans pressed home their attacks and cut off the bridgehead from the river. It was not until about noon that they realised the British had gone. Later in the day, they rounded up about 600 men, mostly wounded in aid stations and those left behind on the north bank, as well as some pockets of resistance that had been out of radio contact with division headquarters and did not know about the withdrawal. Some of the British and Polish paratroopers managed to avoid capture by the Germans and were sheltered by the Dutch underground. They would be hidden in various houses in the towns and villages, or in huts or makeshift dens in the woods, for around a month until they could be rescued in Operation Pegasus on 22 October 1944.

== Aftermath ==
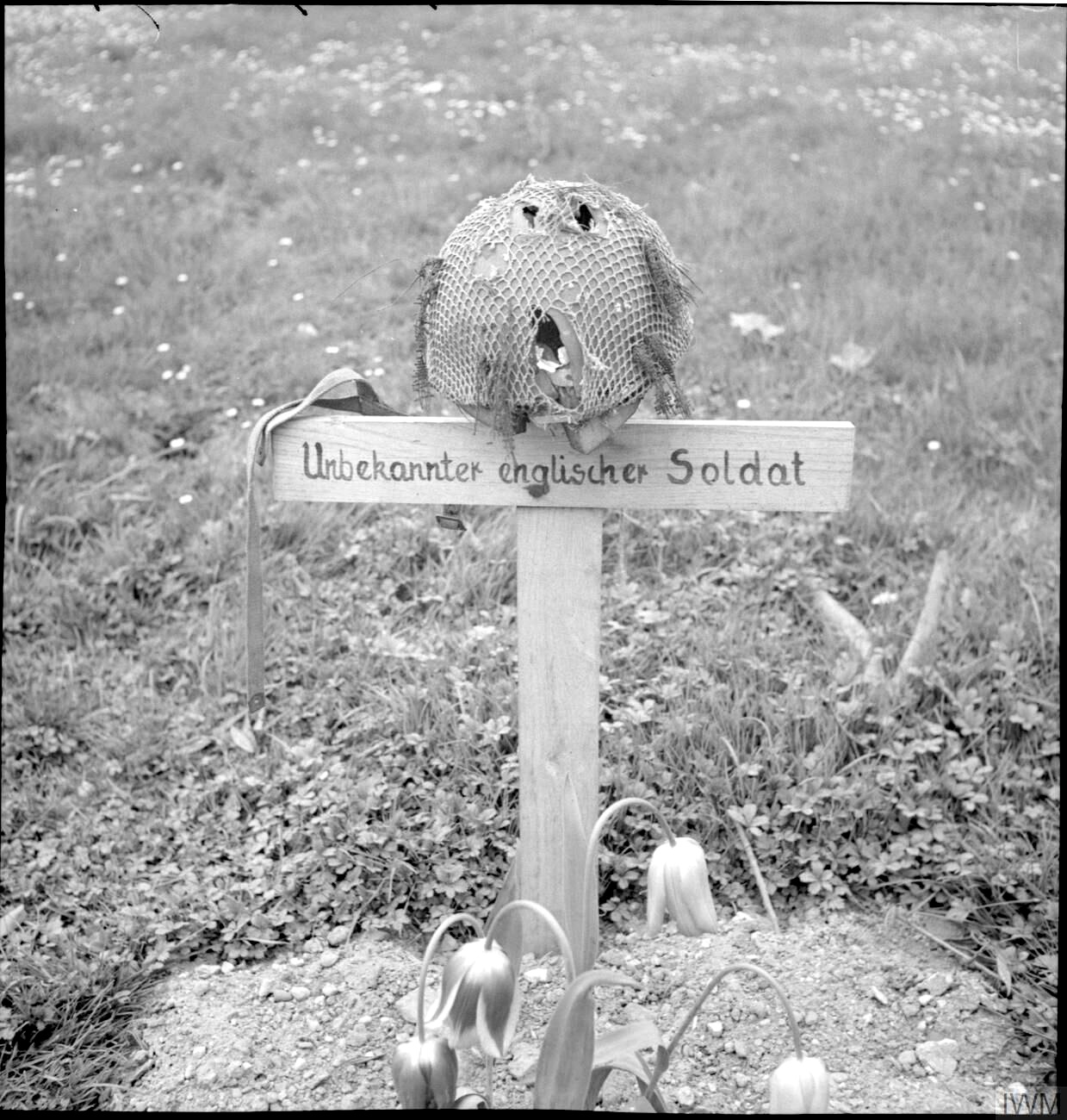
The grave of an unknown soldier at Arnhem, photographed by a British Army sergeant after the liberation of the city in 1945; the sign says "Unknown English Soldier" in German

The Allies withdrew from the southern bank of the Rhine and the front remained on "the island" between the Rhine and Waal rivers. The Germans counter-attacked in October at the Battle of the Nijmegen salient and were repulsed; the front line in the area remained stable until after the winter. The bridgeheads across the Maas and Waal served as an important base for operations against the Germans on the Rhine and Operation Veritable into Germany.

The Polish Brigade was moved to Nijmegen to defend the withdrawal of British troops in Operation Berlin, before returning to England in early October. Shortly afterwards, the British scapegoated Sosabowski and the Polish Brigade for the failure at Arnhem, perhaps to cover their own failings. On 17 October, Montgomery informed Alan Brooke – Chief of the Imperial General Staff – that he felt the Polish forces had "fought very badly" at Arnhem and that he did not want them under his command. David Bennett wrote that Montgomery had almost certainly been fed gross misinformation that supported his prejudices.

A month later, Browning wrote a long letter, highly critical of Sosabowski, to Brooke's deputy. In it, he accused Sosabowski of being difficult, unadaptable, argumentative and "loth to play his full part in the operation unless everything was done for him and his brigade". It is possible that Browning wanted unfairly to blame Sosabowski, although it may equally have been the work of officers of the 43rd Division. Browning recommended that Sosabowski be replaced – suggesting Lieutenant Colonel Jachnik or Major Tonn – and in December the Polish government in exile duly dismissed him, in a move almost certainly made under British pressure.

Carlo D'Este wrote "Sosabowski, an experienced and highly competent officer, was removed because he had become an embarrassment to Browning's own ineptitude. Had Sosabowski's counsel been heeded the battle might have been won, even at the eleventh hour." Although it may be fair to say that Sosabowski was difficult to work with, his scapegoating is judged a disgrace in the accounts of many historians. Brian Urquhart—who had done so much to warn his superiors about the dangers of Arnhem—described the criticism of Sosabowski and the brigade as "grotesque" and his dismissal as a "shameful act".

Arnhem was a victory for the Germans (albeit tempered by their losses further south) and a defeat for the Second Army. Many military commentators and historians believe that the failure to secure Arnhem was not the fault of the airborne forces (who had held out for far longer than planned) but of the operation. John Frost noted that "by far the worst mistake was the lack of priority given to the capture of Nijmegen Bridge" and was unable to understand why Browning had ordered Brigadier General James M. Gavin, the commander of the 82nd Airborne Division, to secure the Groesbeek Heights before Nijmegen Bridge. In his analysis of the battle, Martin Middlebrook believed the "failure of Browning to give the 82nd US Airborne Division a greater priority in capturing the bridge at Nijmegen" was only just behind the weakness of the air plan in importance.

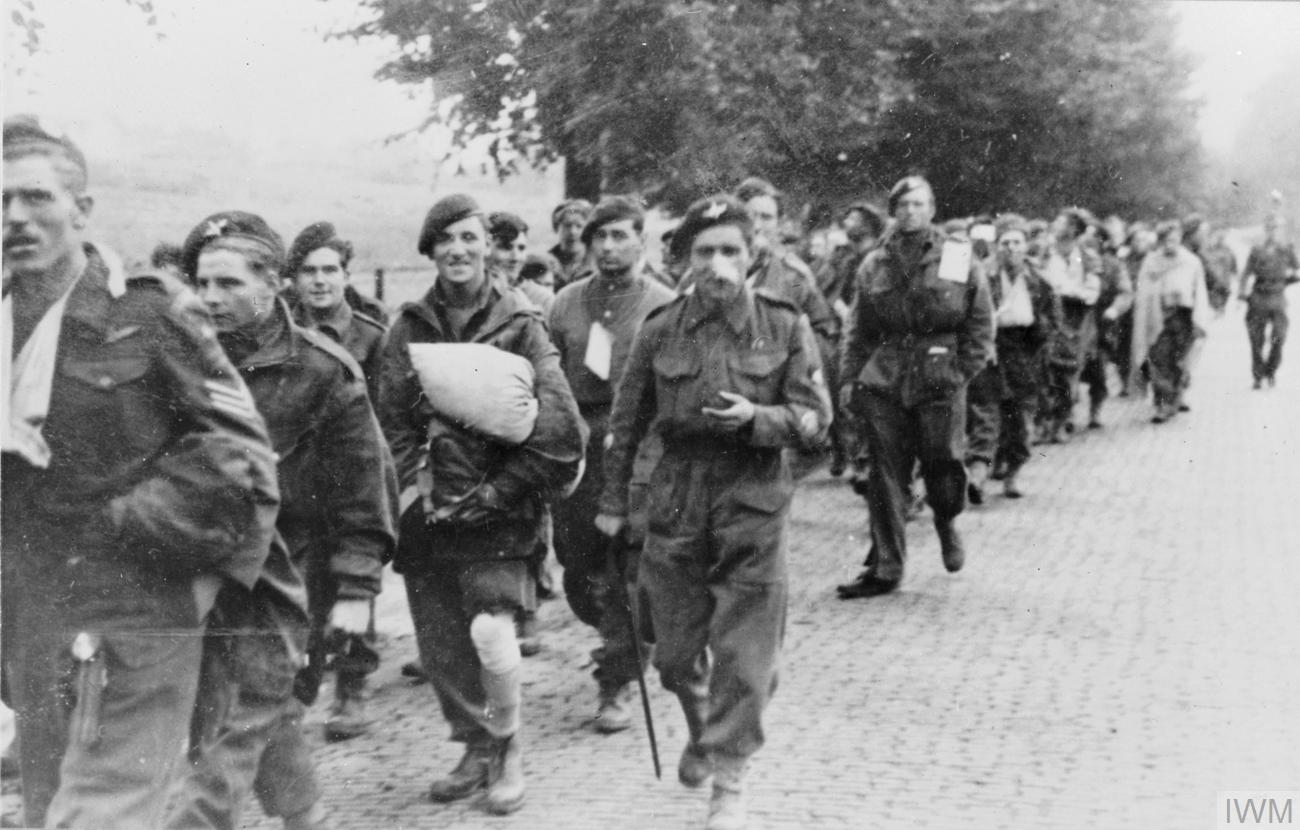
Captured British paratroopers from the Battle of Arnhem, September 1944

In his assessment of the German perspective at Arnhem, Robert Kershaw concluded that "the battle on the Waal at Nijmegen proved to be the decisive event" and that Arnhem became a simple matter of containment after the British had retreated into the Oosterbeek perimeter. After that, it was merely "a side-show to the crisis being enacted on the Waal". Heinz Harmel asserted that "The Allies were stopped in the south just north of Nijmegen – that is why Arnhem turned out as it did". Gavin commented that "there was no failure at Arnhem. If, historically, there remains an implication of failure it was the failure of the ground forces to arrive in time to exploit the initial gains of the [1st] Airborne Division".

The air plan was a grave weakness in the events at Arnhem. Middlebrook believes that the refusal to consider night drops, two lifts on day 1 or a coup-de-main assault on Arnhem bridge were "cardinal fundamental errors" and that the failure to land nearer the bridge threw away the airborne force's most valuable asset – that of surprise. Frost believed that the distance from the drop zones to the bridge and the long approach on foot was a "glaring snag" and was highly critical of the "unwillingness of the air forces to fly more than one sortie in the day [which] was one of the chief factors that mitigated against success".

The Allies' failure to secure a bridge over the Lower Rhine spelled the end of Market Garden. While all other objectives had been achieved, the failure to secure the Arnhem road bridge over the Rhine meant that the operation failed in its ultimate objective. Montgomery claimed that the operation was 90 per cent successful and the Allies had driven a deep salient into German-occupied territory that was quickly reinforced. Milton Shulman observed that the operation had driven a wedge into the German positions, isolating the 15th Army north of Antwerp from the First Parachute Army on the eastern side of the bulge. This complicated the supply problem of the 15th Army and removed the chance of the Germans being able to assemble enough troops for a serious counter-attack to retake Antwerp. Chester Wilmot agreed with this, claiming that the salient was of immense tactical value for the purpose of driving the Germans from the area south of the Maas and removing the threat of an immediate counterattack against Antwerp. Kershaw wrote that the north flank of the west wall was not turned and the 15th Army was able to escape. John Warren wrote that the Allies controlled a salient leading nowhere. John Waddy wrote that the strategic and tactical debate of Market Garden will never be resolved.

Arnhem was described as "a tactical change of plan, designed to meet a favourable local situation within the main plan of campaign," but the result "dispelled the hope that the enemy would be beaten before the winter. First and Third U.S. Armies had already been checked, the former at Aachen and in the Ardennes, the latter at Metz and south of Nancy. The failure to outflank the Siegfried Line finally dictated the pause in the general advance which Montgomery had feared" and meant that General Dwight D. Eisenhower "turned to Antwerp, which despite the long-delayed capture of Le Havre on 12 September, of Brest on 18 September and of Calais on 30 September, remained, as the closest, largest and best-preserved of the ports, the necessary solution to the difficulties of supply.

=== Allied casualties ===
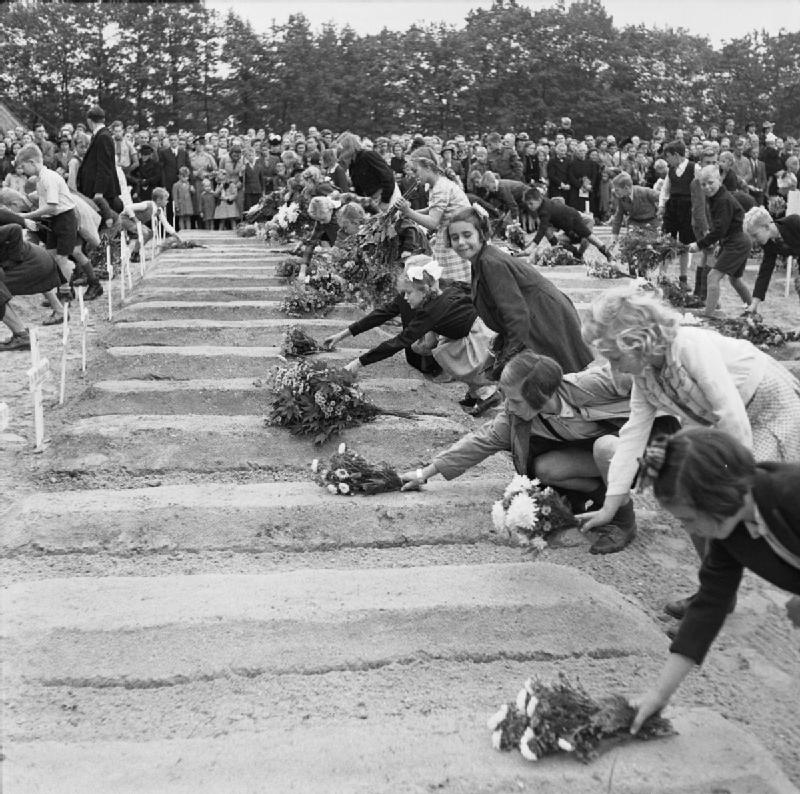
Dutch children lay flowers on the graves of British airborne soldiers at the Arnhem Oosterbeek War Cemetery, circa 1945

The battle was a costly defeat and the 1st Airborne Division never recovered. Three-quarters of the division were missing when it returned to England, including two of the three brigade commanders, eight of the nine battalion commanders and 26 of the 30 infantry company commanders. About 500 men were in hiding north of the Rhine and many of these were able to escape during the winter, initially in Operation Pegasus. New recruits, escapees and repatriated POWs joined the division over the coming months but the division was still so understrength that the 4th Parachute Brigade had to merge with the 1st Parachute Brigade; the division could barely produce two brigades of infantry. Between May and August 1945, many of the men were sent to Denmark and Norway to oversee Operation Doomsday, the German surrenders; on their return the division was disbanded. The Glider Pilot Regiment suffered the highest proportion of fatalities during the battle (17.3 per cent) and was so depleted that in Operation Varsity, RAF pilots flew many of the gliders. As glider operations were abolished after the war, the regiment shrank and was eventually disbanded in 1957.

Allied airborne units
Unit	KIA/ DoW	PoW/ missing	Withdrawn	Total
1st Airborne	1,174	5,903	1,892	8,969
Glider Pilot Regiment	219	511	532	1,262
Polish Brigade	92	111	1,486	1,689
Total	1,485	6,525	3,910	—

Other Allied losses
Unit	KIA/ DoW	PoW/ missing
RAF	368	79
Royal Army Service Corps	79	44
IX Troop Carrier Command	27	6
XXX Corps	25	200
Total	499	329

=== Axis casualties ===
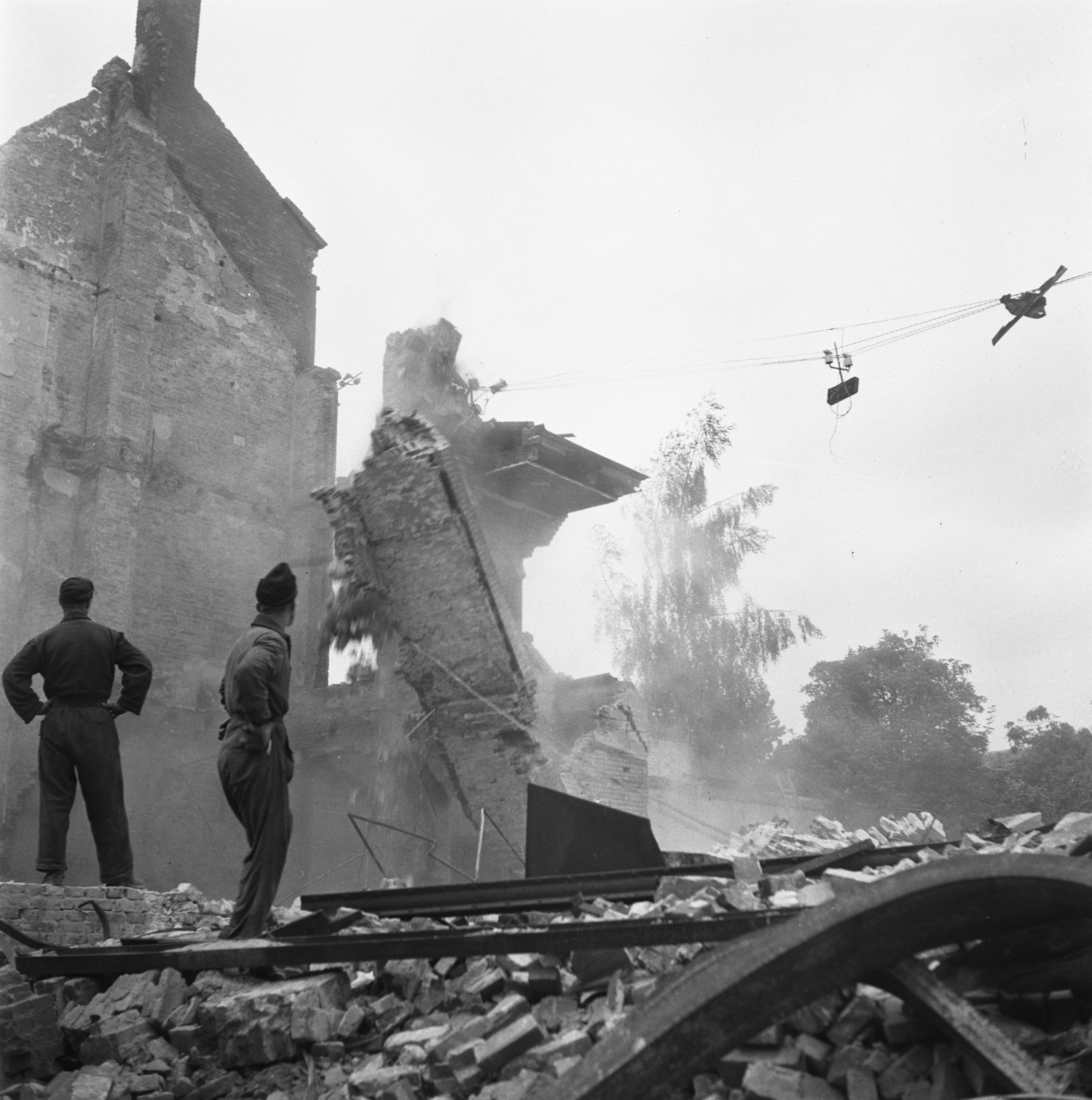
Arnhem after the battle.

German casualty figures are less complete than those of the Allies and official figures have never been released. A signal, possibly sent by II SS Panzer Corps on 27 September, listed 3,300 casualties (1,300 killed and 2,000 wounded) around Arnhem and Oosterbeek. Robert Kershaw's assessment of the incomplete records identified at least 2,500 casualties. In the Roll of Honour: Battle of Arnhem 17–26 September 1944, J.A. Hey of the Society of Friends of the Airborne Museum, Oosterbeek identified 1,725 German dead from the Arnhem area. All of these figures are significantly higher than Model's conservative estimate of 3,300 casualties for the entire Market Garden area of battle (which included Eindhoven and Nijmegen). Kershaw concluded that German casualties were was likely to be about 5,175 for the Arnhem area alone.

=== Arnhem ===
Dutch records suggest that at least 453 civilians died during the battle, either as a result of Allied bombing on the first day or during the subsequent fighting. After the battle, the residents of Arnhem and its surrounding towns and villages were evicted from their homes, allowing the Germans to turn the north bank of the Rhine into an elaborate defensive position. Residents were not allowed to return home without a permit, and most did not return until after the war. The Dutch homes were then systematically looted, with the spoils being sent to bombing victims in Germany. The Germans continued to fight the Allies on the 'Island' between Arnhem and Nijmegen. On 7 October, the Arnhem bridge was bombed and destroyed by Martin B-26 Marauders of 344th Bomb Group, USAAF. The buildings of Arnhem were bombarded by the Allies over the next few months and suffered further during the Liberation of Arnhem in April 1945.

== Honours and memorials ==
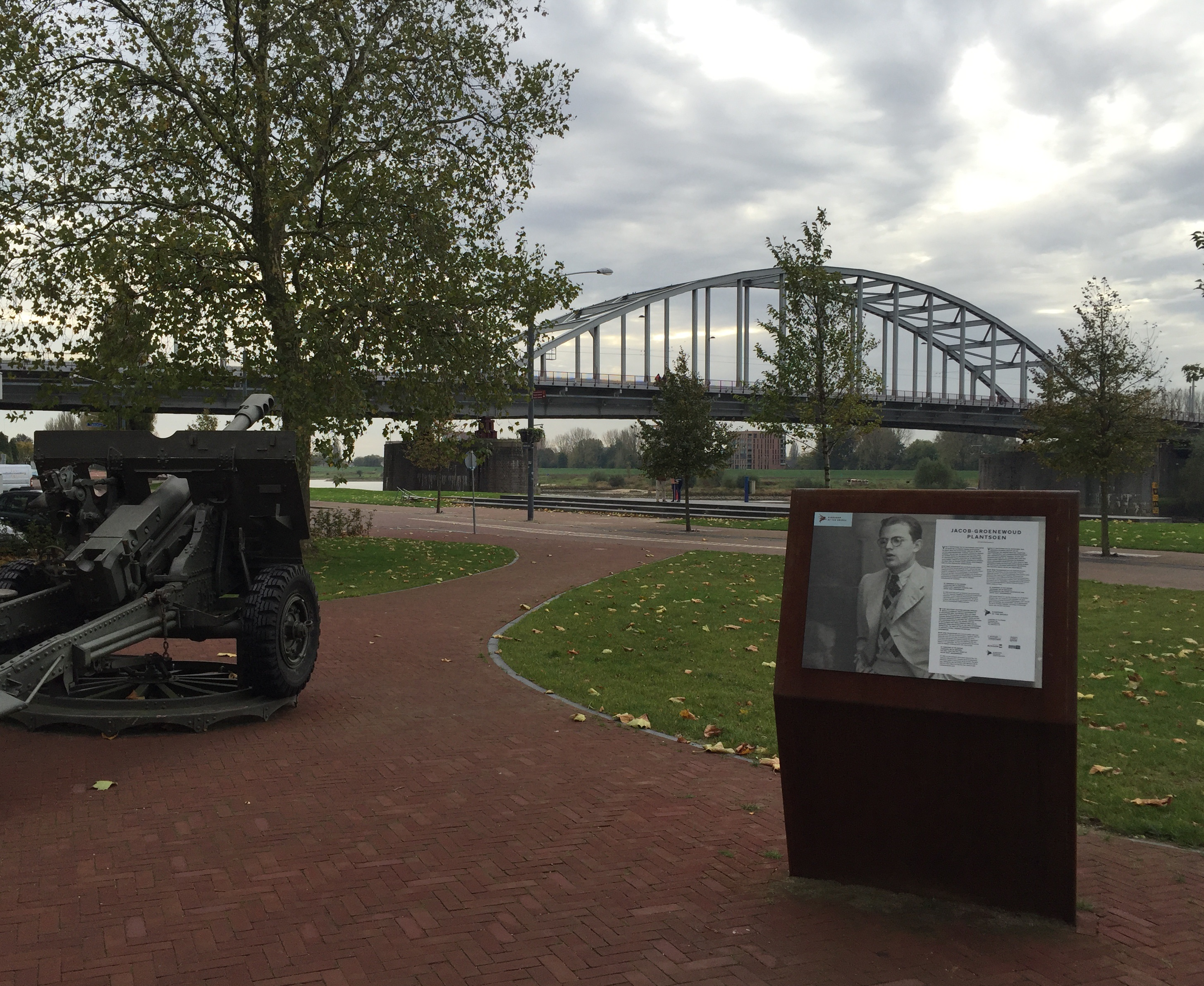
The John Frost Bridge, seen from a nearby memorial.

Although the battle was a defeat for the British 1st Airborne Division, their fight north of the Rhine is considered an example of courage and endurance in the Second World War. Despite being one of the last failures of the British Army, Arnhem has set a training standard for the Parachute Regiment. Montgomery claimed that "in years to come it will be a great thing for a man to be able to say: 'I fought at Arnhem' ".

Within days of Operation Berlin, the British returned to a heroes' welcome in England. A list of 59 decorations was quickly published for the 2,000 men who had returned and an investiture ceremony for the division was held at Buckingham Palace in December. Decorations for the 6,000 who had not returned were not published until September 1945 and numbered only 25. Five of the British participants in the battle were awarded Britain's highest award for gallantry, the Victoria Cross. Four were members of the Airborne forces and one was from the RAF. They were:

- Lance-Sergeant John Baskeyfield, 2nd Battalion, South Staffordshire Regiment
- Major Robert Cain, 2nd Battalion, South Staffordshire Regiment
- Flight Lieutenant David Lord 271 Squadron, Royal Air Force
- Captain Lionel Queripel, 10th Battalion, Parachute Regiment
- Lieutenant John Grayburn, 2nd Battalion, Parachute Regiment

The British and Commonwealth system of battle honours recognised participation in fighting at Arnhem in 1956, 1957 and 1958 by the award of the battle honour Arnhem 1944 to six units. After the liberation of the Netherlands, the Grave Registration units of the Second Army began the task of identifying the British dead. They were buried together in a field that is on permanent loan to the Commonwealth War Graves Commission just north of Oosterbeek. There are nearly 1,800 graves in what is now known as the Airborne Cemetery, ¾ of which are for those killed during the 1944 battle. By 2003, there were still 138 men unaccounted for and human remains, equipment and weaponry continue to be dug up in the farmland around the city.

In Germany, the battle was treated as a great victory and eight men were awarded the Knight's Cross of the Iron Cross. The German dead were gathered and buried in the SS Heroes Cemetery near Arnhem but after the war they were reburied in Ysselsteyn.

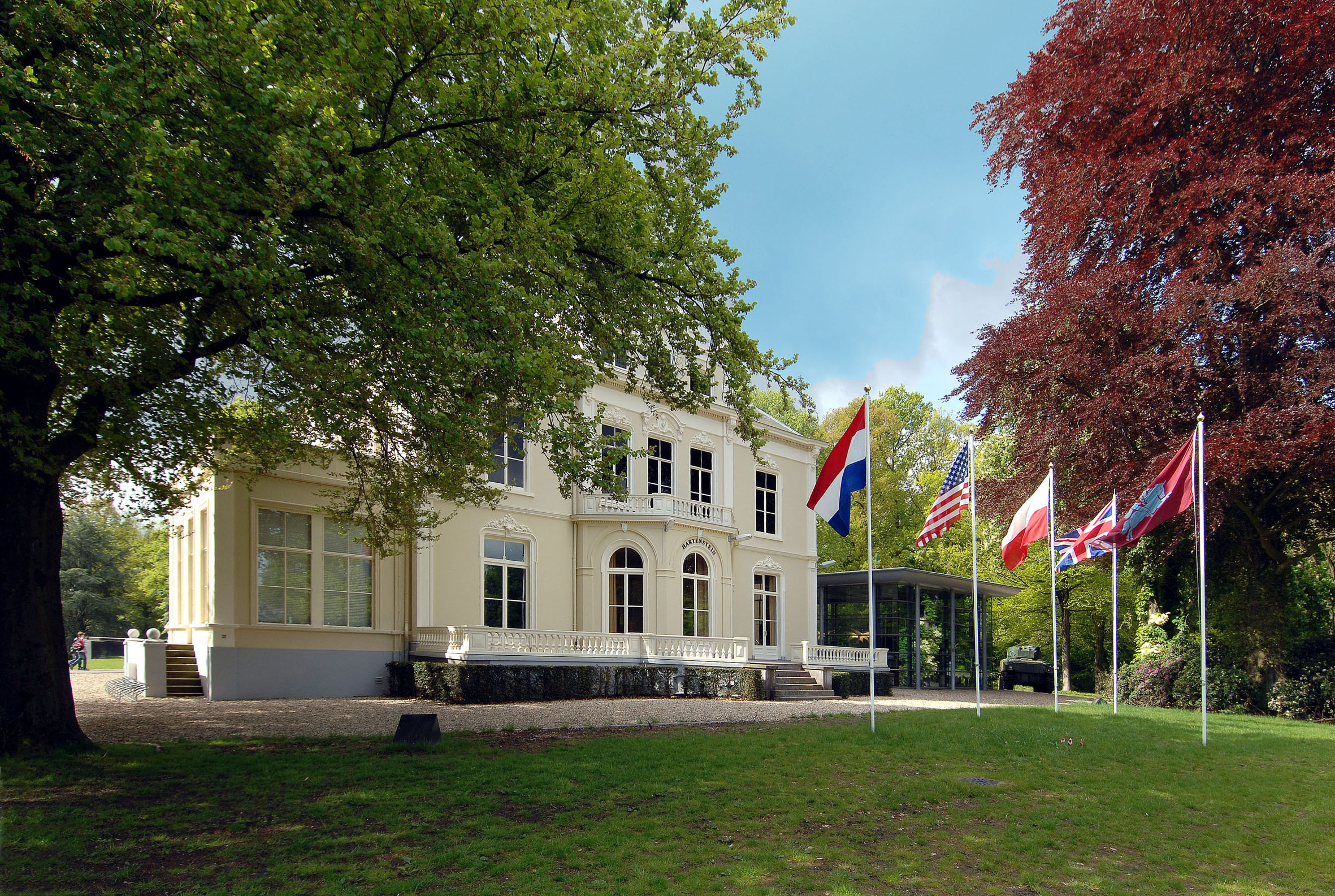
The Airborne Museum at the Hotel Hartenstein.

The shattered Arnhem road bridge was briefly replaced by a succession of Bailey bridges before being rebuilt in the same style as the original. It was renamed John Frostbrug (John Frost Bridge) on 17 December 1977. On 31 May 2006, HM Queen Beatrix of the Netherlands conferred two honours on the Polish forces who fought at the battle. The Polish 1st Independent Airborne Brigade was awarded the Dutch Military William Order for gallantry and Stanisław Sosabowski was posthumously awarded the Bronze Lion. In February of that year, an appeal was launched to raise funds so that a memorial to General Sosabowski and the brigade could be erected. The memorial was unveiled in September 2006 in a ceremony that sought to undo the injustice of 1944.

Eusebius Church, which was largely destroyed, also lost its 32-bell carillon dating back to 1652. Petit & Fritsen constructed a new, 49-bell carillon for the reconstructed church between 1958 and 1964. Since then, the carillon became associated with the yearly war memorial services held each May. In 1994, fifty years after the Battle of Arnhem, four bass bells were added to the instrument, with the largest funded by several English organisations. One of the 1994 bells features a quote from the book A Bridge Too Far and the film adaptation.

The Hotel Hartenstein, used by Urquhart as his headquarters, is now the home of the Airborne Museum. Several other memorials were built in Arnhem and Oosterbeek, and an annual parade is held in the area. A memorial near the museum reads:

To the People of Gelderland; 50 years ago British and Polish Airborne soldiers fought here against overwhelming odds to open the way into Germany and bring the war to an early end. Instead we brought death and destruction for which you have never blamed us. This stone marks our admiration for your great courage remembering especially the women who tended our wounded. In the long winter that followed your families risked death by hiding Allied soldiers and Airmen while members of the resistance led many to safety.

== In popular culture ==
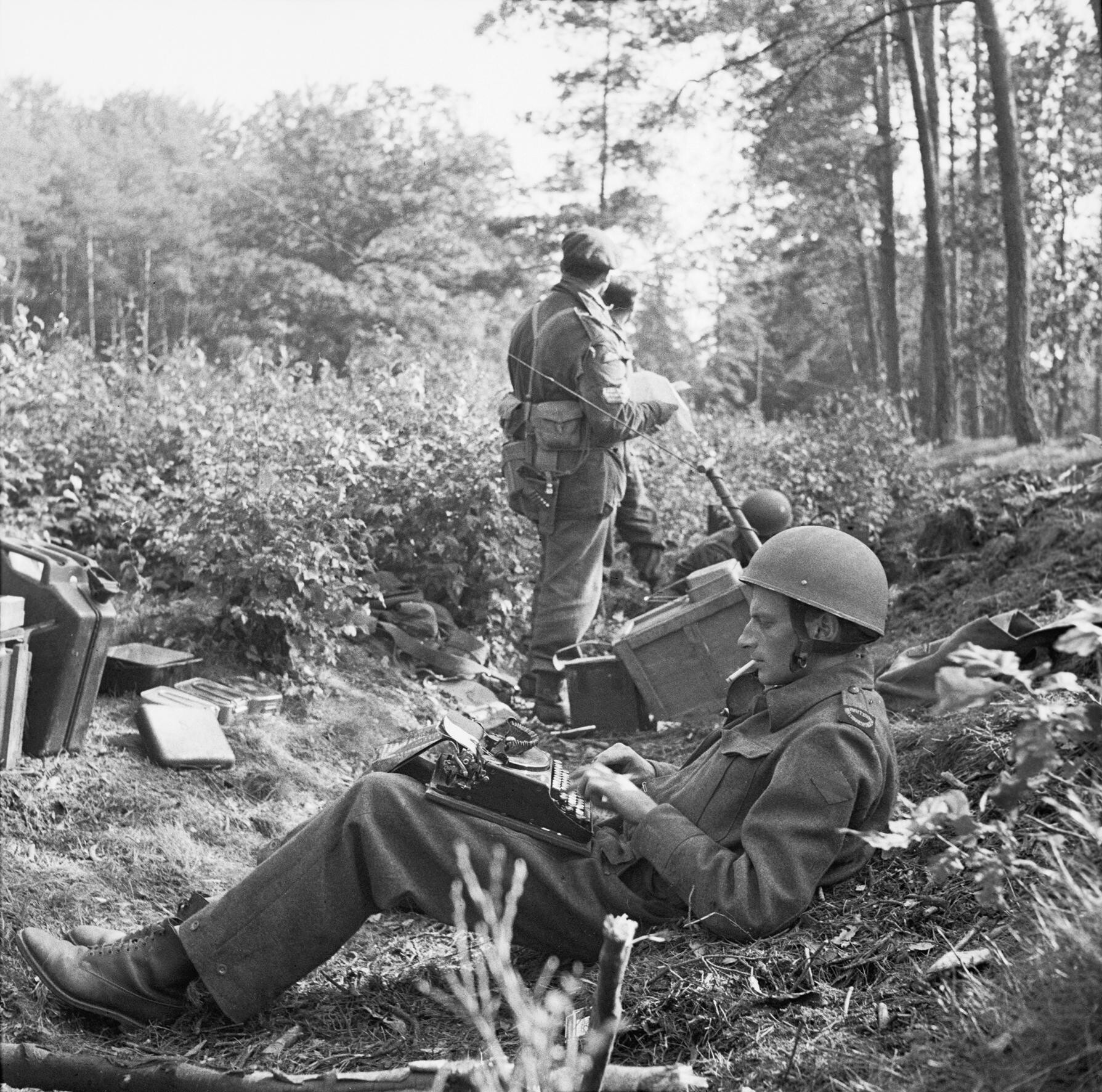
Alan Wood, war correspondent for the Daily Express, types a dispatch during the battle. Behind him is Sergeant Lewis of the Army Film and Photographic Unit.

The progress of the battle was widely reported in the British press, thanks largely to the efforts of two BBC reporters (Stanley Maxted and Guy Byam) and three journalists (newspaper reporters Alan Wood of the Daily Express and Jack Smyth of Reuters) who landed in a glider among the British paratroopers. The journalists sent their reports back almost daily – ironically making communication with London at a time when Divisional Signals could not. The paratroopers were also accompanied by a three-man team from the Army Film and Photographic Unit, which recorded the course of the battle – including many of the images on this page.

In 1945, Louis Hagen, a Jewish refugee from Germany and a British army glider pilot present at the battle, wrote Arnhem Lift, believed to be the first book published about the events at Arnhem. At the same time filming began for the war movie Theirs is the Glory, which featured original footage from the actual battle and used 120 veterans of the Arnhem battle as extras in other scenes. In 1974, Cornelius Ryan's book A Bridge Too Far brought the battle to a wide audience, as did Richard Attenborough's adaptation of the book into the eponymous film in 1977. The film employed Frost, Urquhart and Arnhem veteran John Waddy as military consultants.

== See also ==
- Arnhem Oosterbeek War Cemetery
- Evacuation of Arnhem, the evacuation of civilians from Arnhem by German forces on 24 and 25 September 1944, lasting until April 1945
- Operation Fustian, 1st Parachute Brigade's previous airborne operation during the Invasion of Sicily.
- Operation Ladbroke, 1st Airlanding Brigade's operation during the Invasion of Sicily.
- Operation Pegasus, the escape of several Arnhem survivors a month after the battle.
- Second Battle of Arnhem, the April 1945 liberation of the city.
- William of Orange (pigeon)

== Bibliography ==
- Ambrose, Stephen (1992). Band of Brothers. Pocket Books & Design. ISBN 0-7434-2990-7.
- Badsey, Stephen (1993). Arnhem 1944, Operation Market Garden. Osprey. ISBN 1-85532-302-8.
- Bennett, David (2008). A Magnificent Disaster. Casemate. ISBN 978-1-932033-85-4.
- Buckingham, William (2002). Arnhem 1944. Temps Publishing. ISBN 0-7524-1999-4.
- Buckingham, William (2019). Arnhem: The Complete Story of Operation Market Garden 17–25 September 1944. Amberley. ISBN 978-1-39-810156-2.
- D'Este, Carlo (2015). Eisenhower: A Soldier's Life. New York: Henry Holt and Company. ISBN 978-1-62779-961-4.
- Ehrman, John (1956). Grand Strategy: August 1943 – September 1944. History of the Second World War. Vol. V. London: HMSO. OCLC 530340578.
- Evans, Martin (1998). The Battle for Arnhem. Pitkin. ISBN 0-85372-888-7.
- Frost, Major General John (1980). A Drop Too Many. Cassell. ISBN 0-85052-927-1.
- Gavin, Major General James (1980) [1947]. Airborne Warfare. Battery Press airborne series (No. 10) (repr. Battery Press, TN ed.). Infantry Journal Press. ISBN 0-89839-029-X.
- Goldman, William (1977). William Goldman's Story of a Bridge Too Far. Coronet Books. ISBN 0-340-22340-5. [NB: Book has no page numbers]
- Kershaw, Robert (1990). It Never Snows in September. Ian Allan Publishing. ISBN 0-7110-2167-8.
- Kinloch, Nicholas (2023). From the Soviet Gulag to Arnhem: A Polish Paratrooper's Epic Wartime Journey. Barnsley: Pen and Sword. ISBN 978-1-399-04591-9.
- Middlebrook, Martin (1994). Arnhem 1944: The Airborne Battle. Viking. ISBN 0-670-83546-3.
- Rodger, Alexander (2003). Battle Honours of the British Empire and Commonwealth Land Forces. Marlborough, UK: The Crowood Press. ISBN 1-86126-637-5.
- Ryan, Cornelius (1999) [1974]. A Bridge Too Far. Wordsworth Editions. ISBN 1-84022-213-1.
- Shulman, Milton (2004) [1947]. Defeat in the West. Cassell. ISBN 0-304-36603-X.
- Steer, Frank (2003). Battleground Europe – Market Garden. Arnhem – The Bridge. Leo Cooper. ISBN 0-85052-939-5.
- Waddy, John (1999). A Tour of the Arnhem Battlefields. Pen & Sword Books Limited. ISBN 0-85052-571-3.
- Wilmot, Chester (1997) [1952]. The Struggle For Europe. Wordsworth Editions. ISBN 1-85326-677-9.
- Zwarts, Marcel (2024). Einsatz Arnheim: German Armoured Units and their Opponents at Arnhem and Oosterbeek September 1944. Zwarts Publishing. ISBN 978-9-08-348130-2.
