= Eburru =

Village in Rift Valley Province, Kenya

Eburru is a village in Kenya. Eburru is found in Kenya's countryside, along the Great Rift Valley. It is located approximately 7 hours outside Keyna's capital, Nairobi, near the Ol Doinyo Eburru volcano.

Eburru is home to Primary and Secondary Schools. A high school was built in 2017–18 with the help of local missionary, Pastor Steve Njenga, and his family.
