= Frank Dutton Frost =

Brigadier-General Frank Dutton Frost CBE MC
- Born: 17 January 1882
- Died: 3 December 1968 (aged 86)
- Military career
- Allegiance: United Kingdom
- Branch: British Indian Army
- Service years: 1901–1930
- Rank: Brigadier-General
- Conflicts: Second Boer War; World War I
- Awards: Commander of the Order of the British Empire; Military Cross

Brigadier-General Frank Dutton Frost, CBE, MC (17 January 1882 – 3 December 1968) was a British Army officer, who later joined the British Indian Army.

== Biography ==
Frost served in South Africa during the Second Boer War, first as a trooper with the Royal Wiltshire Yeomanry contingent to the Imperial Yeomanry, and from November 1901 with the 3rd (Militia) Battalion of the Cheshire Regiment, where he was commissioned a second lieutenant. He was promoted to lieutenant on 31 May 1902, and left South Africa with the rest of the battalion in September 1902, after the end of the war. He received a regular commission in the Cheshire regiment in 1906.

Frost served during the First World War. On 21 September 1914 he transferred to the Supply & Transport Corps of the British Indian Army. Later he was in put in charge of the Directorate of Labour in Baghdad during the Mesopotamian campaign. On 13 June 1918 he was appointed a director of labour and was granted the temporary rank of brigadier general whilst employed in this role.

On retirement from the Army in October 1930 with the rank of colonel and honorary brigadier-general, he then worked as a missionary in the North-West Frontier until 1945.

He married in 1912 Elsie Dora Bright. Their son was John Dutton Frost, an officer who served in the Parachute Regiment during the Second World War. They also had two daughters. His wife died in 1952. In 1954 he married for a second time, Rhoda Collins, widow of Edward Collins, Kelvindale.
