= British airborne operations in North Africa =

British operations part of the Tunisian Campaign of World War II

- Part of the Tunisian campaign of World War II
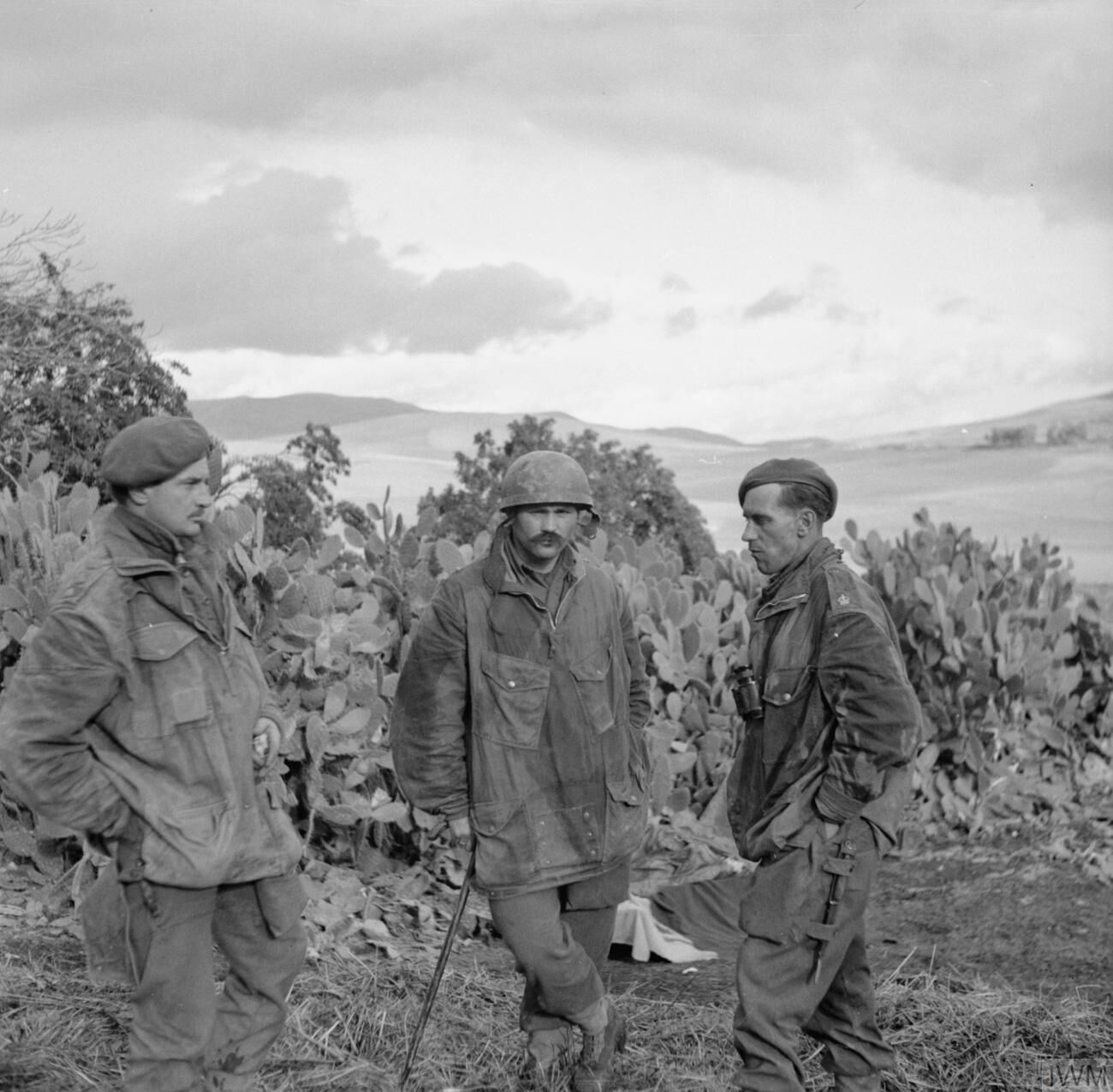
- Officers of the 2nd Parachute Battalion resting near Beja after returning from a drop on Depienne.
Date	November 1942 – April 1943
Location	Algeria; Tunisia
Result	British victory

Belligerents
United Kingdom	Germany; Italy

Commanders and leaders
(United Kingdom) Edwin Flavell	Unknown

Strength
Brigade	Various

Casualties and losses
1,700	Unknown

The British airborne operations in North Africa were conducted by British paratroopers of the 1st Parachute Brigade, commanded by Brigadier Edwin Flavell, as part of the Tunisian campaign of World War II, over the period between November 1942 and April 1943.

When planning began for Operation Torch, the Allied invasion of North Africa in 1942, it was decided to attach the 1st Parachute Brigade, part of the 1st Airborne Division, to the Allied forces taking part, as an American airborne unit, the 2nd Battalion, 509th Parachute Infantry Regiment, was also to be used during the invasion. After a short period of training and being brought up to operational strength, mainly with men from the 2nd Parachute Brigade, also part of the 1st Airborne Division, the brigade was deployed to North Africa in November 1942.

Units from the 1st Para Brigade dropped near Bône on 12 November, then near Souk el-Arba and Béja on 13 November, and at Pont Du Fahs on 29 November, seizing airfields, fighting as infantry after each action and linking up with an Allied armoured force, supporting it until December. Due to the inability of units of the British First Army to link up with the Pont Du Fahs force, the 2nd Parachute Battalion, under Lieutenant Colonel John Frost, was forced to retreat over fifty miles towards the nearest Allied units; it was attacked several times during the retreat, and although it reached Allied lines safely it had taken more than 250 casualties.

For the next four months the 1st Para Brigade was used in a ground role, serving under several formations and advancing with Allied ground forces; it suffered heavy casualties on several occasions but also took large numbers of Axis prisoners. The brigade was transferred out of the front in mid-April 1943 and left to rejoin the rest of the 1st Airborne Division to train for Operation Husky, the Allied invasion of Sicily.

== Background ==
=== Formation ===
The German military was one of the pioneers of the use of airborne formations, conducting several successful airborne operations during the Battle of France in 1940, including the Battle of Fort Eben-Emael. Impressed by the success of German airborne operations, the Allied governments decided to form their own airborne formations. This decision would eventually lead to the creation of two British airborne divisions, as well as a number of smaller units. The British airborne establishment began development on 22 June 1940, when the Prime Minister, Winston Churchill, directed the War Office in a memorandum to investigate the possibility of creating a corps of 5,000 parachute troops. Despite the Prime Minister's desire to have 5,000 airborne troops within a short period, a number of problems were rapidly encountered by the War Office. Very few military gliders existed in Britain in 1940, and these were too light for military purposes, and there was also a shortage of suitable transport aircraft to tow gliders and carry paratroopers. On 10 August, Churchill was informed that although 3,500 volunteers had been selected to train as airborne troops, only 500 could currently begin training because of limitations in equipment and aircraft. The War Office stated in a memorandum to the Prime Minister in December 1940 that 500 parachute troops could probably be trained and be ready for operations by the spring of 1941, but this figure was purely arbitrary; the actual number that could be trained and prepared by that period would rely entirely on the creation of a training establishment and the provision of required equipment.

A training establishment for parachute troops was set up at RAF Ringway, near Manchester, on 21 June 1940 and named the Central Landing Establishment, and the initial 500 volunteers began training for airborne operations. A number of gliders were being designed and constructed by the Royal Air Force, which had also provided a number of Armstrong Whitworth Whitley medium bombers for conversion into transport aircraft. Organizational plans were also being laid down, with the War Office calling for two parachute brigades to be operational by 1943. However, the immediate development of any further airborne formations, as well as the initial 500 volunteers already training, was hampered by three problems. With the threat of invasion in 1940, many War Office officials and senior British Army officers did not believe that sufficient men could be spared from the effort to the rebuild the Army after the Battle of France to create an effective airborne force; many believed that such a force would only have a nuisance raiding value and would not affect the conflict in any useful way. There were also material problems; all three of the armed services were expanding and rebuilding, particularly the Army, and British industry had not yet been organised to a sufficient war footing to support all three services as well as the fledgling airborne force. Finally, the airborne forces lacked a single, coherent policy, with no clear idea as to how they should be organised, or whether they should come under the command of the Army or the RAF; inter organizational rivalry between the War Office and the Air Ministry, in charge of the RAF, was a major factor in delaying the further expansion of British airborne forces.

=== Expansion ===
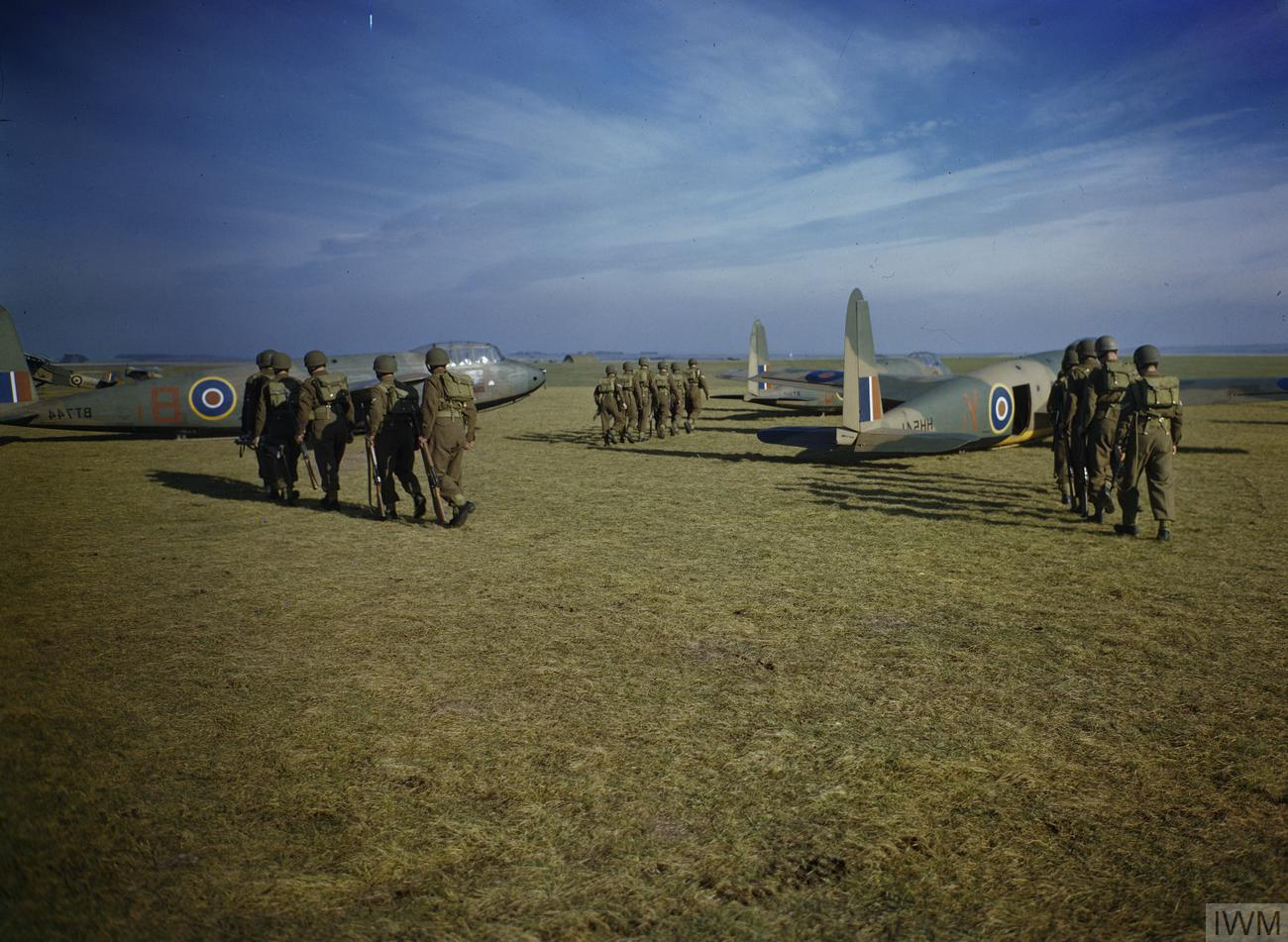
Six man parties of 1st Airborne Division Paratroops marching toward Hotspur gliders of the Glider Pilot Exercise Unit at Netheravon.

However, despite these difficulties, by mid 1941 the fledgling airborne establishment was able to form the first British airborne unit. This was No. 11 Special Air Service Battalion, which numbered approximately 350 officers and other ranks, and had been formed by converting and retraining No. 2 Commando. On 10 February 1941 thirty eight men from the battalion conducted the first British airborne operation, Operation Colossus, a raid against an aqueduct in southern Italy; it was hoped that the destruction of the aqueduct would deprive Italian civilian and military installations of their water supply, damage Italian morale and the Italian war effort in North Africa. The raid was a failure, with all but one of the airborne troops being captured by Italian military forces, but it did help provide the British airborne establishment with vital lessons for future operations. Shortly after the operation had been conducted, a memorandum was circulated through the War Office by the Chiefs of Staff of the Army and Royal Air Force requiring that No. 11 Special Air Service Battalion be expanded into a Parachute Brigade. In July, after a period of discussion about the problems of creating such a formation, the Chief of the Imperial General Staff authorised the raising of a brigade headquarters, 1st, 2nd, 3rd and 4th Parachute Battalions and an air troop of sappers from the Royal Engineers. Given the title of 1st Parachute Brigade, volunteers from infantry units were recruited for the new formation from 31 August. Initially commanded by Brigadier Richard Nelson Gale, who was replaced in mid 1942 by Brigadier Edwin Flavell, the brigade began an extensive training regime, which included conducting trials and tests of new airborne equipment. On 10 October it was joined by 1 Airlanding Brigade, which had been formed from 31 Independent Brigade Group, a formation recently returned from India. This was shortly followed, on 29 October, by the formation of Headquarters 1st Airborne Division under the command of Brigadier F.A.M. Browning, who would have under his control 1st Parachute Brigade, 1st Airlanding Brigade, and the glider units currently training with the two brigades.

Browning was shortly after promoted to the rank of Major General, and he then supervised the newly formed division as it underwent a prolonged of expansion and intensive training, with new brigades being raised and then assigned to the division and even more new equipment being tested. By mid April 1942 the division was able to conduct a small scale airborne exercise for the benefit of the Prime Minister, in which twenty one transport aircraft and nine gliders participated, and by late December the division had been brought up to full strength. In mid September, as the division was coming close to reaching full strength, Browning was informed that Operation Torch, the Allied invasion of North Africa, would take place in November. After being informed that the 2nd Battalion of the American 503rd Parachute Infantry Regiment was to take part in the campaign, he argued that a larger airborne force should be utilised during the invasion, as the large distances and comparatively light opposition would provide a number of opportunities for airborne operations. The War Office and Commander in Chief, Home Forces were won over by the argument, and agreed to detach 1st Parachute Brigade from 1st Airborne Division and place it under the command of General Dwight D. Eisenhower, who would command all Allied troops participating in the invasion. The Air Ministry was unable to provide transport aircraft or aircrews to operate with the brigade, so the United States Army Air Forces took over this responsibility, providing 60 Group of 51 Wing which flew Douglas C-47 Dakotas. A practice drop was conducted with a unit from the brigade on 9 October, although a lack of American familiarity with British airborne equipment and parachuting technique, as well a lack of British familiarity with the Dakota, led to three men being killed; this meant a delay in training whilst new techniques were developed, which in turn resulted in the majority of the brigade's personnel travelling to North Africa without having conducted a training drop from a Dakota. After it had been brought to full operational strength, partly by cross posting personnel from the newly formed 2nd Parachute Brigade, and had been provided with sufficient equipment and resources, the brigade departed for North Africa at the beginning of November.

== Operations ==
=== Bône ===
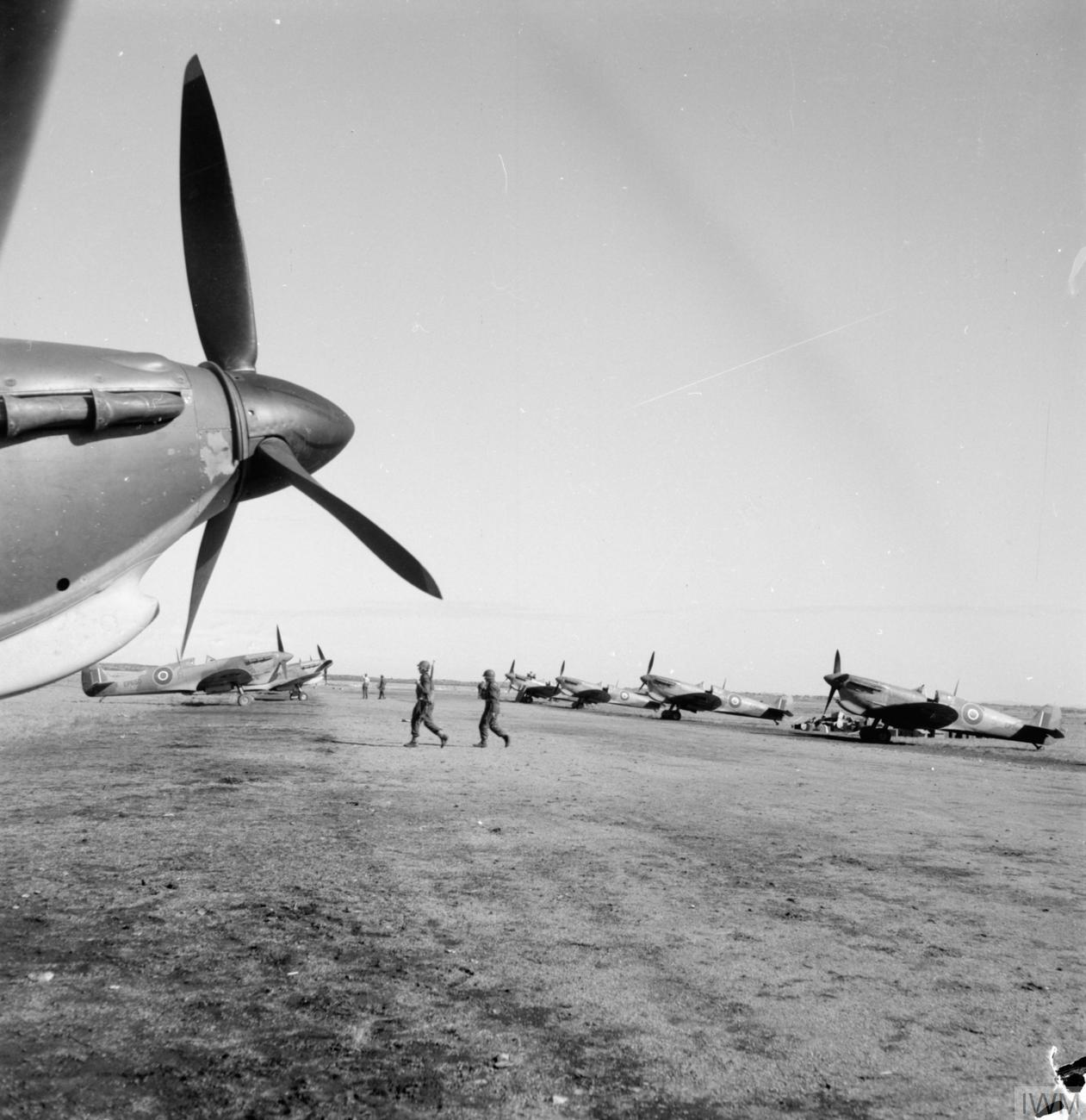
Supermarine Spitfire Mark Vs, reinforcement aircraft for North African units, lined up at Bone airfield, Algeria.

As an insufficient number of transport aircraft were allocated to the brigade, it was only possible to transport 3rd Parachute Battalion by air, with the battalion's strength consisting of its headquarters staff and 'B' and 'C' companies. (Note: 'A' Company remained with the rest of 1st Parachute Brigade, and would land with the brigade in Algiers on 12 November.) The battalion landed at Gibraltar at dawn on 10 November, and its commander, Lieutenant Colonel Geoffrey Pine Coffin, was informed that the battalion was scheduled to conduct an airborne operation the next day. Pine Coffin was briefed by Lt. Gen. Kenneth Anderson, commander of the British First Army, on the mission; it was to take off from the airfield at Maison Blanche and conduct a parachute drop to capture an airfield near the port of Bône, which bordered both Tunisia and Algeria. It was known by Allied intelligence that a battalion of German Fallschirmjaeger were currently stationed at Tunis, and that they were likely to be given the same task; as such, it was vital that the two companies capture the airfield first. Once this had been achieved, it would then hold the airfield until relieved by No. 6 Commando, which would conduct an amphibious landing, capture Bône itself and link up with the battalion. This was a challenging task for Pine Coffin, as the battalion had arrived in fewer Dakotas than it would need to conduct a parachute drop, and two aircraft had failed to arrive at Gibraltar; however, sufficient aircraft were found and at 04:30 on 11 November they took off from Gibraltar, landing at Maison Blanche at 09:00. However, since the American pilots flying the Dakotas had no experience with night drops and locating drop zones in darkness was extremely difficult, it was decided to delay the mission until dawn on 12 November.

The day before the operation, Pine Coffin and his staff began to plan for the mission. The 29 Dakotas that were to transport the battalion would take off from Maison Blanche and follow the coast until they reached the harbour at Bône. The leading Dakota would then turn south east and fly low over the airfield to ascertain its status. If it was unoccupied, the paratroopers would be dropped onto the airfield, but if the Fallschirmjaeger were present then the Dakotas would drop the companies a mile away; there they would form up and launch an attack on the airfield. The planning was completed by 16:30, and at 20:00 the American pilots were briefed on the operation, which was briefly interrupted when a German aircraft flew over the area and dropped a stick of bombs. The aircraft took off at 08:30 the next day and experienced an uneventful flight to the airfield, although two aircraft experienced mechanical problems and ditched into the ocean, causing three casualties. The lead Dakota flew over the airfield, and after observing the airfield to be unoccupied, dropped its paratroopers, followed in succession by the remaining transport aircraft. The drop was reasonably accurate, with a few containers and paratroopers being dropped three miles from the airfield. Thirteen men were injured during the drop, primarily when they landed, and one was killed when he accidentally shot himself with his Sten gun. One officer was knocked unconscious during landing and remained so for the next four days, on occasion being heard to murmur "I'll have a little more of the turbot, waiter!".

Unknown to the British force, their drop had been observed by a flight of German Junkers Ju 52 transport aircraft, carrying a Fallschirmjaeger battalion; having seen that the airfield was already occupied, the aircraft turned back towards Tunis. When it had secured the airfield, the battalion came under attack from Stuka divebombers, and was initially defenceless. However, once No. 6 Commando had secured Bône, a number of Oerlikon anti aircraft guns were salvaged from sunken vessels in the port's harbour, and these, in combination with a squadron of Spitfires that arrived on the evening of 11 November, were used to fend off future attacks. The battalion held the airfield in conjunction with No. 6 Commando until 15 November, when it withdrew and linked up with 'A' Company and the rest of 1st Parachute Brigade at Maison Blanche.

=== Béja and Souk el Arba ===
1st Parachute Brigade, less 3rd Parachute Battalion, arrived at Algiers on 12 November, with some of its stores arriving slightly later. By the evening, reconnaissance parties had travelled to the airfield at Maison Blanche, with the remainder of the brigade following on the morning of 13 November; it was quartered in Maison Blanche, Maison-Carrée and Rouiba. On the same day, the brigade was joined by 2nd Battalion of the American 509th Parachute Infantry Regiment, which was forthwith attached to the brigade; the battalion had arrived in North Africa on 8 November, and been supporting the advance of the United States Fifth Army. The original intentions of Lieutenant General Kenneth Anderson, commander of the British First Army, had been to have the brigade, minus 3rd Parachute Battalion, conduct a parachute drop against the port of Tunis, approximately five hundred miles behind German lines. The brigade had been issued with briefing materials for the operation, which it studied as it sailed to North Africa, but the plan had been abandoned by the time it arrived; Allied intelligence reported that between 7,000 and 10,000 German troops had recently been airlanded in Tunis, which ensured that an airborne operation was out of the question. With this ambitious plan cancelled, on 14 November First Army directed that a single parachute battalion would be dropped the next day near Souk el-Arba and Béja; the battalion was to contact French forces at Beja to ascertain whether they would remain neutral, or support the Allies; secure and guard the cross roads and airfield at Soul el Arba; and patrol eastwards to harass German forces. The 2nd Battalion of the 509th PIR would drop at the same time, with the objective of capturing the airfields at Tebessa and Youks el-Bain. 1st Parachute Battalion, commanded by Lieutenant Colonel James Hill, was selected for the task, to which Hill objected. The battalion had been forced to unload the vessel carrying its supplies and equipment itself, and had also to arrange its own transportation to Maison Blanche as no drivers were provided at Algiers; when it had arrived at Maison Blanche, it had been subjected to several Luftwaffe air raids that targeted the airfield. Hill argued that as a result his men were exhausted, and he did not believe all of the battalion's equipment could be sorted out within twenty four hours; as such he asked for the operation to be postponed for a short period, but this was denied.

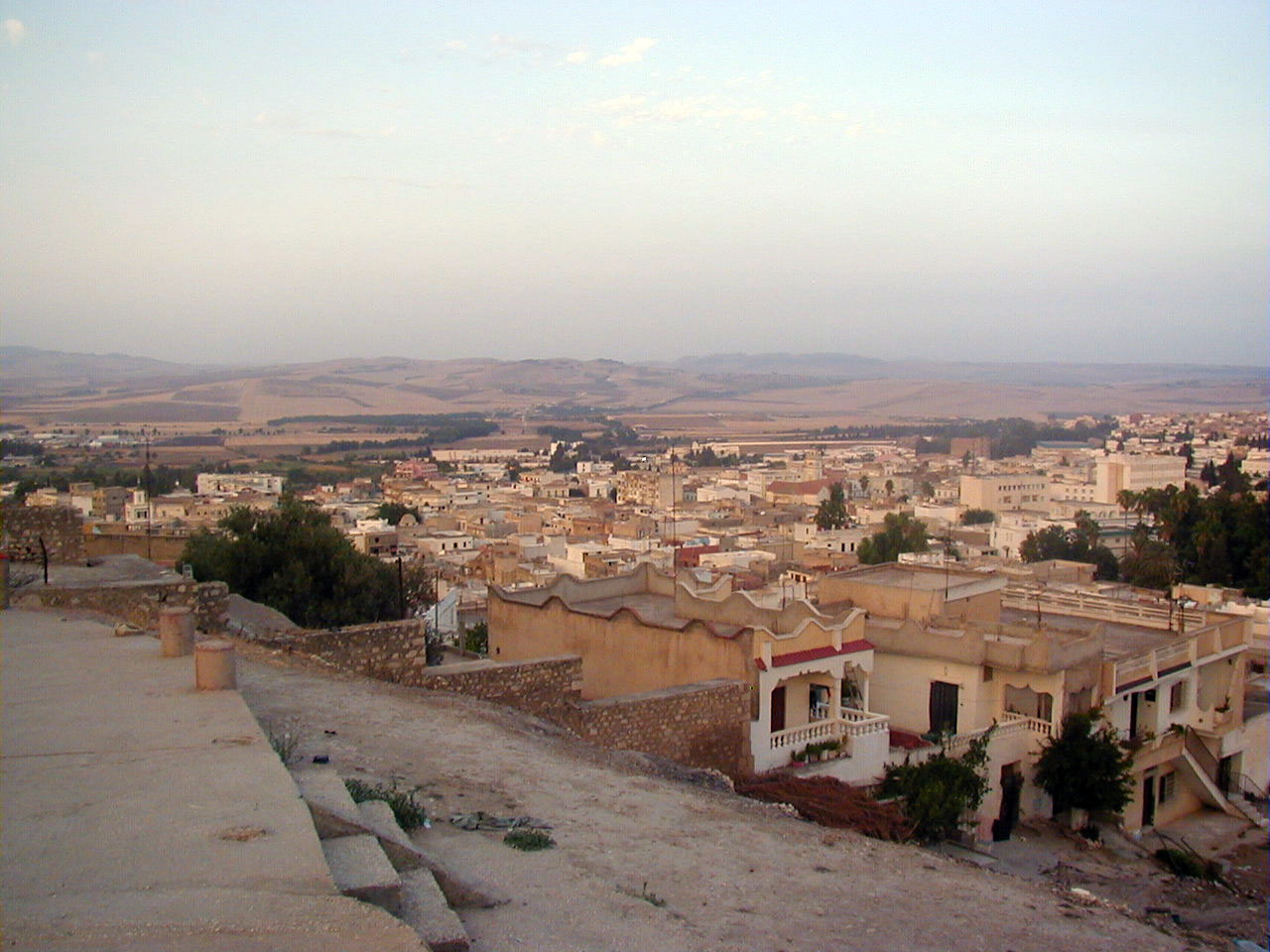
Panoramic view of Béja.

Hill faced further problems as he planned for the operation. The American pilots of the Dakota transport aircraft that would transport the battalion were inexperienced and had never conducted a parachute drop before, and there was no time for any training or exercises. There was also no photos of the airfield or the surrounding areas, and only a single, small scale map available for navigation. To ensure that the aircraft found the drop zone and delivered the battalion accurately, Hill decided that he would sit in the cockpit of the leading Dakota and assist the pilot. Despite the battalion's parachutes only arriving at 16:30 on 14 November, and were packed twelve to a container which meant they had to be removed and individually repacked, the battalion was prepared by 15 November and took off at 07:30. The Dakotas were escorted by four American P-38 Lightning fighters, which engaged and drove off two roving German fighters, but as the Dakotas approached the Tunisian border, they encountered thick clouds and were forced to turn back, landing at Maison Blanche at 11:00. It was decided that the battalion would conduct the operation the next day, which allowed the paratroopers to rest for a night. At the same time, 2nd Battalion of the 509th PIR successfully conducted a drop at Tebessa, capturing its objectives and securing the area; it then passed from the control of 1st Parachute Brigade and remained in the area for some time. 1st Parachute Battalion took off on the morning of 16 November, and encountered excellent weather which allowed the transport aircraft to drop the battalion accurately around the airfield at Souk el Arba. Most of the paratroopers landed successfully, but one man was killed when his rigging line twisted around his neck mid drop, throttling him; one officer broke his leg on landing, and four men were wounded when a Sten gun was accidentally fired. The battalion's second in command, Major Pearson, remained at the airfield with a small detachment which collected airborne equipment and supervised the burial of the casualty.

Meanwhile, Lieutenant Colonel Hill led the rest of the battalion, approximately 525 strong, in some commandeered trucks towards the town of Béja, an important road and railway centre approximately forty miles from the airfield. The battalion arrived around 18:00 and was welcomed by the local French garrison, 3,000 strong, which Hill managed to persuade to cooperate with the paratroopers; in order to give the garrison and any German observers the impression that he possessed a larger force than he actually did, Hill arranged for the battalion to march through the town several times, wearing different headgear and holding different equipment each time. A short time after the battalion entered Béja, several German aircraft arrived and bombed the town, although they caused little damage and no casualties. The next day, 'S' Company was sent with a detachment of engineers to the village of Sidi N'Sir, about twenty miles away; they were to contact the local French forces, believed to be pro British, and harass German forces. The detachment found the village and made contact with the French, who allowed them to pass through towards the town of Mateur; by nightfall the force had not reached the town, and decided to encamp for the night. At dawn a German convoy of armoured cars passed the detachment, and it was decided to set an ambush for the convoy if it returned, with anti-tank mines being laid on the road and a mortar and Bren guns being set up in concealed positions. When the convoy returned at approximately 10:00 the leading vehicle struck a mine and exploded, blocking the road, and the other vehicles were disabled with mortar fire, Gammon bombs and the remaining anti tank mines. A number of Germans were killed and the rest taken prisoner, with two paratroopers being slightly wounded. The detachment returned to Béja with prisoners and several slightly damaged armoured cars. After the success of the ambush, Hill sent a second patrol to harass local German forces, but it was withdrawn after it encountered a larger German force that inflicted several British casualties; Béja was also bombed by Stuka divebombers, inflicting civilian casualties and destroying a number of houses.

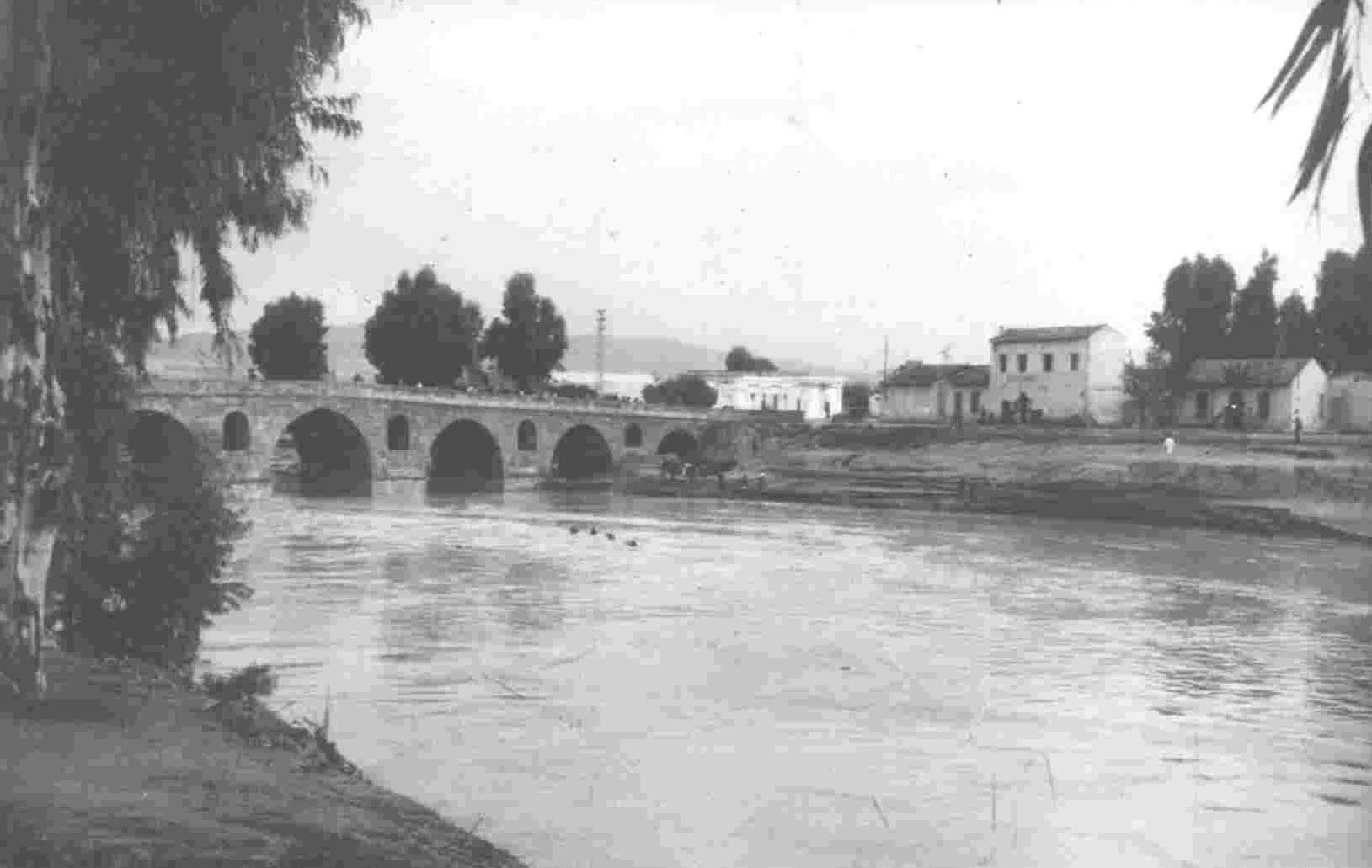
The bridge at Medjez el Bab.

On 19 November, Hill visited the commanding officer of the French forces guarding a vital bridge at Medjez el Bab, and warned him that any attempt by German forces to cross the bridge would be opposed by the battalion. Hill attached 'R' Company to the French forces to ensure the bridge was not captured. German forces soon arrived at the bridge, and their commanding officer demanded that they be allowed to take control of the bridge and cross it to attack the British positions. The French rejected the German demands, and in conjunction with 'R' Company repelled subsequent German attacks that lasted several hours. The battalion was reinforced with the American 175th Field Artillery Battalion and elements of the Derbyshire Yeomanry, but despite fierce resistance the German forces proved to be too strong, and by 04:30 on 20 November the Allied forces had yielded the bridge and the surrounding area to the Germans. Two days later, Hill received information that a strong Italian force, which included a number of tanks, was stationed at Gue Hill. Hill decided to attack the force and attempt to disable the tanks, and the following night moved the battalion, less a small guard detachment which remained at Béja, to Sidi N'Sir where it linked up with a force of French Senegalese infantry. Hill decided that the battalion's section of 3 inch mortars would cover 'R' and 'S' Companies as they advanced up Gue Hill and attacked the Italian force, while a small force of sappers would mine the road at the rear of the hill to ensure the Italian tanks could not retreat.

The battalion arrived at the hill without incident and began to prepare for the attack; however, just prior to the beginning of the attack there were several loud explosions from the rear of the hill. The anti tank grenades carried by the sappers had accidentally detonated, killing all but two of them. The battalion lost the element of surprise, and Hill immediately ordered the two companies to advance up the hill. The force reached the top of the hill and engaged a mixed force of German and Italian soldiers, who were assisted by three Italian light tanks. Hill drew his revolver, and with his adjutant and a small group of paratroopers advanced on the tanks, firing shots through their observation ports in an attempt to persuade the crews to surrender. The tactic worked on two tanks, but upon reaching the third tank Hill and his men were fired upon by the tanks crew; Hill was shot three times in the chest and his adjutant wounded, and the tank crew swiftly dispatched with small arms fire. Hill survived because of prompt medical treatment, and was replaced as commander of the battalion by Major Pearson, who supervised the routing of the rest of the German and Italian soldiers. Two days later the battalion moved from Beja to an area south of Mateur, where it linked up with Allied ground forces and came under the command of an armoured regimental group known as 'Blade Force'; the battalion remained in the area in conjunction with 'Blade Force' until it was withdrawn on 11 December.

=== Depienne and Oudna ===
On 18 November, 1st Parachute Brigade was ordered by British First Army to prepare 2nd Parachute Battalion, commanded by Lieutenant Colonel John Frost, to drop near the coastal city of Sousse in order to deny the nearby port and airfield to the Axis. There being a limited number of transport aircraft available to the brigade, it was decided that two companies would take off from Maison Blanche at 11:00 on 19 November, with the remainder of the battalion following the next day; the length of the operation was estimated to be ten days. However, the operation was delayed for twenty four hours on 18 November, and again on 19 November for a further period; during this period, 3rd Parachute Battalion arrived at Maison Blanche, which was itself subjected to several Axis air raids which inflicted several casualties on the airborne troops and damaged several aircraft. Finally on 27 November the brigade was ordered to prepare 2nd Parachute Battalion for a parachute drop near the town of Pont du Fahs, in order to deny its use to the Axis; it would also raid airfields at Depienne and Oudna in order to destroy any enemy aircraft stationed there. The battalion would then link up with ground forces from the British First Army, who would be advancing towards the battalion's position at the time of the parachute drop. At 23:00 on 27 November the operation was delayed for 48 hours, and on the night of 28 November the brigade was informed that Pont du Fahs had been occupied by advance elements of 78th Infantry Division. Despite this, and difficulties in procuring aerial photographs of the proposed landing zones, the brigade was ordered to have 2nd Battalion drop at the airfield at Depienne; the battalion was to destroy all aircraft stationed there and at the Oudna airfield, spread 'fear and despondency' amongst nearby Axis troops, and then link up with ground forces from British First Army advancing towards Tunis.

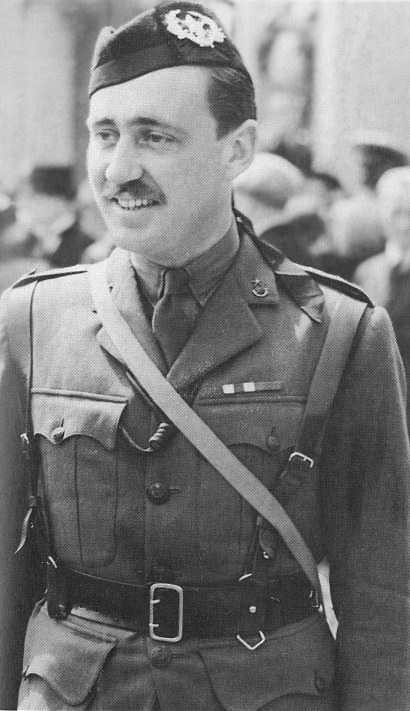
John Dutton Frost, commanding officer of 2nd Parachute Battalion.

On the morning of 29 November, the 530 strong battalion boarded 44 transport aircraft and took off, bound for Oudna. Because there had been insufficient time to conduct an aerial reconnaissance of the airfield, Lieutenant Colonel Frost was forced to choose a landing zone for the battalion from his position in the lead aircraft, fortunately locating a clear, open space near the airfield. The airfield had been abandoned by the Germans, and the landing for the battalion was scattered but unopposed, although it incurred seven casualties during the drop, one of which was fatal. The airfield was secured after the battalion had rallied; a platoon from 'C' Company remained at the airfield to guard the wounded and the discarded parachutes, and at midnight the rest of the battalion moved out towards Oudna. As the battalion advanced the only transport available to it were a few hand drawn mule carts, which made the unit look, in the words of one paratrooper, "like a fucking travelling circus rather than a parachute battalion." By 11:00 on 30 November the battalion had reached a position that allowed it to overlook the Oudna airfield, and at 14:30 it began to advance and reached the airfield, only to find that it, too, had been abandoned. The battalion was then counter attacked by a number of German tanks supported by fighters and Stuka divebombers. The Germans were repelled, but at dusk Frost pulled the battalion back westwards to a more defensible position, hoping to await the arrival of advance units from British First Army. These, however, were not to arrive; in a wireless message received at dawn on 1 December, Frost was informed that the Allied drive towards Tunis had been postponed.

A short while later a German armoured column was seen advancing from Oudna, and Frost decided to set an ambush to try to destroy it; the leading elements of the column, however, surprised a group of paratroopers filling water bottles at a nearby well, the ambush was sprung too early, inflicting only a single casualty. The battalion was understrength, having taken casualties at Oudna, and was running low on ammunition, but it managed to drive off the column with mortar fire; however, this was only a brief respite. Two armoured cars and a tank was seen to be moving towards the battalion from a different direction, reportedly sporting recognition signals of British First Army; Frost sent a party out to greet the vehicles, only for them to be taken prisoner and it to be revealed that the vehicles were German with captured equipment. The German commander sent one of the captured paratroopers with a message demanding Frost surrender, but he refused to comply; instead he ordered that the radios and mortars were to be destroyed and the battalion would evacuate westwards towards Allied lines, approximately fifty miles away. The battalion managed to withdraw to higher ground, but suffered a number of casualties from the German armour as it did so. Now positioned on the high ground, which consisted of a ridge crowned by two small hills, the paratroopers were attacked by tanks and infantry supported by heavy mortar fire. The battalion suffered a number of casualties but was saved by the unexpected intervention of German aircraft; mistaking their troops for the paratroopers, they knocked out several tanks and inflicted heavy casualties.

The battalion had by now suffered approximately 150 casualties, and as such Frost took the decision for the battalion to retreat westwards again, with the wounded to be left behind and guarded by a small detachment; at nightfall each company would attempt to make its way to the village of Massicault. On the night of 31 November/1 December, the battalion began its retreat, moving as quickly as possible, but a number of paratroopers became disorientated and were captured by German forces pursuing the battalion. By 2 December Battalion Headquarters, the Support Company and attached sappers, commanded by Frost, had reached an Arab farm, where they linked up with 'A' Company and formed a group about 200 strong; however, a large number of paratroopers were still missing. German forces soon located and surrounded Frost and his men and a fierce battle began; because the paratroopers were so low on ammunition Frost realised the farm could not be held, and during the night he led a charge through the weakest part of the German defences. Once they had broken through, Frost used his hunting horn to rally the remaining paratroopers, and they then marched for the Allied held town of Medjez el Bab; after stopping at one last farm for supplies, the group reached the town on 3 December and linked up with American patrols. Stragglers continued to reach Allied lines over the next few days, aided by units from the 56th Reconnaissance Regiment, but the battalion ultimately suffered sixteen officers and 250 other ranks killed, captured or wounded during the mission. Several historians have commented on the operation. Rick Atkinson has labelled the mission "a foolish, wanton mistake" let down by inadequate intelligence; and Peter Harclerode makes a similar argument, writing that the mission was "a disastrous episode, badly planned and based on faulty intelligence." For Otway, the mission "suffered from a lack of information, and from a lack of adequate arrangements for a link up between the ground forces and too lightly armed and comparatively immobile airborne troops."

=== Ground role ===
Reinforcements for 2nd Parachute Battalion arrived from Britain to make good the battalion's losses, and on 11 December it moved to Souk el Khemis, linking up with the rest of the Brigade. As Frost and his men retreated from Oudna, the Brigade had been informed it would be used in an infantry role, and on 11 December it came under the operational control of British V Corps and moved to positions near Beda; when it arrived No. 1 Commando and a French unit, 2e bataillon, 9e régiment de tirailleurs algériens, were assigned to its command. The brigade took up defensive positions around Beda and deployed patrols around the immediate vicinity, but remained in a static role; on 21 December it was placed under the command of 78th Infantry Division to participate in an attack towards Tunis, but heavy rain caused this operation to be cancelled. When it was decided that continuing poor weather made any further assault towards Tunis impractical, Brigadier Flavell asked that the brigade be transferred to the rear so that it could be used in an airborne role. His request was denied, however, as V Corps stated that there were insufficient troops to replace the brigade; as such it remained in its positions, defending the entire Beda area.

The brigade subsequently became heavily involved in fighting throughout the front it occupied, especially 3rd Parachute Battalion, which launched several attacks on a geographical feature known as 'Green Hill'; during multiple attacks, several companies from the battalion were able to gain the crest of the hill, only to be driven back by enemy counter attacks. On the night of 7 8 January the brigade was relieved from the frontline and transported to Algiers, with the exception of 2nd Parachute Battalion, which remained under the command of 78th Infantry Division because of a lack of troops to replace it. Plans were made to use the brigade in conjunction with US II Corps to cut Axis lines of communications around Sfax and Gabes, but these were never finalised. On 24 January it was transferred back to V Corps and came under the command of 6th Armoured Division, but did not remain there for long; two days later it came under the command of XIX French Corps, located in area around Bou Araba. There it was given command of several French units and stationed between 36th Infantry Brigade and 1st Guards Brigade. On 2 February 1 Parachute Battalion was ordered to mount an attack on the massifs of Djebel Mansour and Djebel Alliliga, supported by a company belonging to the French Foreign Legion. The battalion launched its attack during the night and by the next morning had captured both features against fierce opposition; however, heavy casualties meant that the battalion was forced to retreat from Djebel Alligila and concentrate on Djebel Mansour. There they were cut off from supplies and almost all reinforcements, and counter attacks by 6th Armoured Division failed to reach the battalion. A battalion from the Grenadier Guards was able to capture most of Djebel Alliliga on 4 February, but both battalions came under increasingly heavy attack, and by 11:00 the next day it was decided to withdraw both battalions.

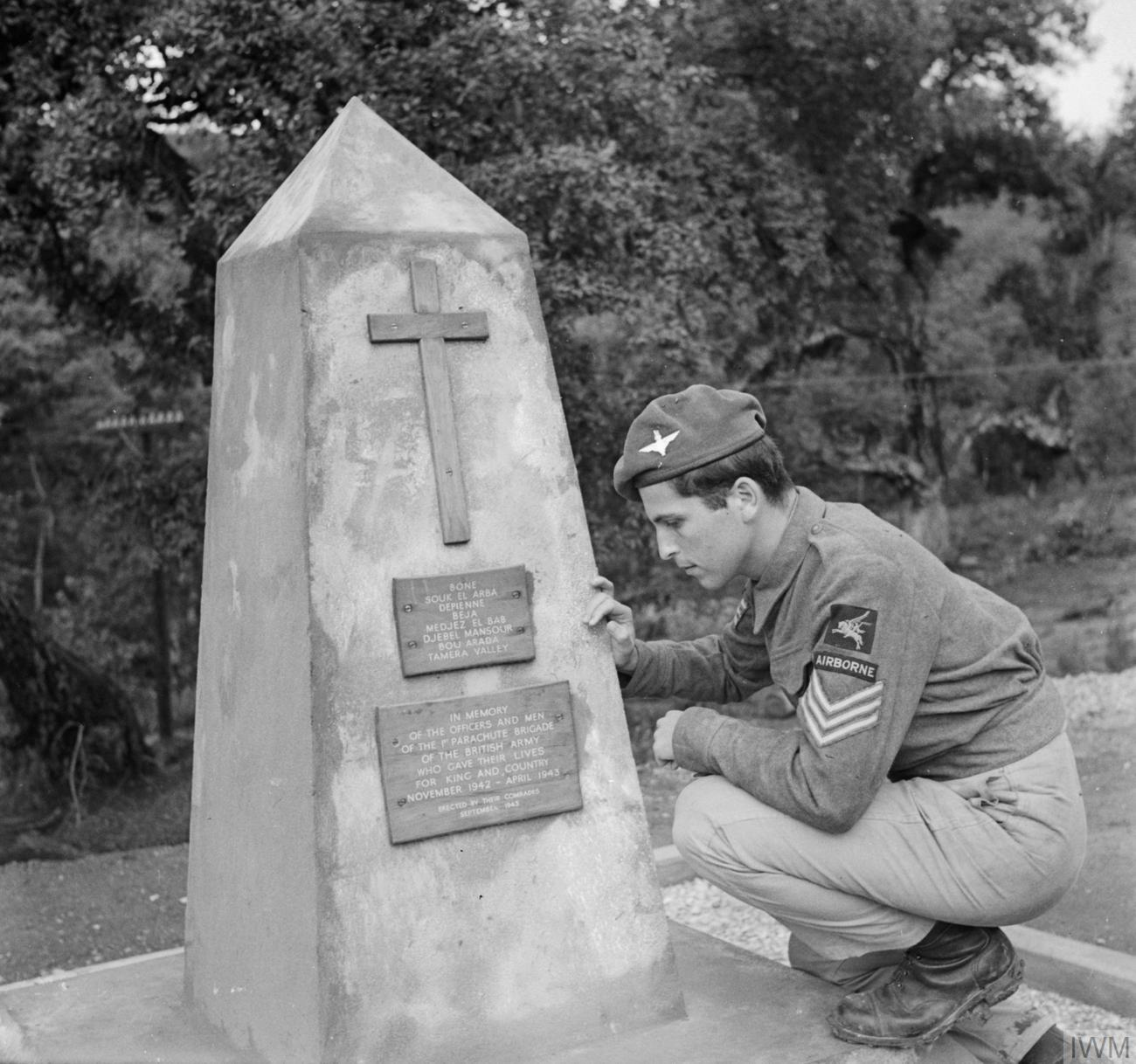
Soldier of the 2nd Parachute Battalion examines a memorial to the 1st Parachute Brigade in the Tamara Valley, 14 October 1943.

On 8 February 2 Parachute Battalion was transferred back to 1st Parachute Brigade, and the entire formation came under the command of 6th Armoured Division and then British Y Division, an ad hoc division which relieved 6th Armoured Division in the middle of February. The brigade remained in static positions for the rest of February, repelling several minor enemy attacks and then a major offensive Operation Ochsenkopf, which took place on 26 February, during which it inflicted some 400 casualties and took 200 prisoners at a cost of 18 killed and 54 wounded paratroopers. On 3 March the brigade was relieved by 26 US Regimental Combat Team and marched to new positions located astride the road that ran between Tamara and Sedjenane. The brigade then held those positions against several attacks that took place between 8 9 March, taking almost 200 prisoners. On 10 March Brigadier Flavell was given command of all forces in the brigade's sector including 139th Brigade and No. 1 Commando and the entire force repelled several more attacks. On the night of 17 March, however, the entire force was compelled to retreat several miles to new positions after a particularly strong attack broke through the positions held by 139th Brigade and several French battalions. These new positions were held against several more enemy attacks, and secured by 19 March. 2nd and 3rd Parachute Battalions were placed in reserve on 20 March on the request of Brigadier Flavell, who argued that the brigade as a whole was exhausted and required rest. However, 3rd Parachute Battalion was ordered back to the front on 21 March and tasked with attacking a feature known as 'The Pimple' after a previous attack had failed with heavy casualties. It launched an attack on the feature that night, but was forced to withdraw by dawn the next day after exhausting its ammunition and taking numerous casualties. Because 'The Pimple' was regarded as a vital position from which a general Allied offensive could be launched, however, the brigade was ordered to attack it again. 1st Parachute Battalion did so on the night of 23 March and successfully seized it after several hours of fighting.

On 27 March, the entire brigade participated in a general Allied offensive aimed at taking control of the area around Tamera. 1st and 2nd Parachute Battalions launched an attack at 23:00 the same day, taking numerous prisoners and securing their objectives and then repulsed a German counterattack, albeit with heavy losses. Further heavy and often confusing fighting continued, with several companies of 3rd Parachute Battalion having to be attached to 2nd Parachute Battalion to reinforce it. 1st Parachute Battalion also seized its own objectives, and by the end of 29 March the brigade had secured all of its objectives and taken 770 German and Italian troops as prisoners. On 31 March the brigade then took up positions covering the left flank of 46th Division, and for the next two weeks it remained in the area, conducting numerous patrols but encountering little opposition. On 15 March the brigade was relieved by 39 US Regimental Combat Team and moved to the rear. It then travelled to Algiers on 18 April and remained there; Brigadier Flavell left for England to take up a new command, and was replaced by Brigadier Gerald Lathbury. Shortly afterwards the brigade rejoined 1st Airborne Division and began training for the airborne landings that would take place during Operation Husky, the Allied invasion of Sicily.

== Aftermath ==
During its time in North Africa, the 1st Parachute Brigade had captured more than 3,500 enemies as prisoners of war (POWs) and suffered well over 1,700 casualties. To take Lieutenant Colonel John Frost's 2nd Parachute Battalion as an example, it had entered North Africa with a strength of 24 officers and 588 other ranks, absorbed some 230 replacements in January 1943, and left in April with 14 officers and 346 other ranks, an overall casualty rate of eighty percent. In the 1st Parachute Battalion, only four officers had remained with the battalion throughout the entire Tunisian Campaign without being killed or sufficiently wounded to be sent to the rear. The brigade had also been given the title of 'Rote Teufel' or 'Red Devils' by the German troops they had fought; this was a distinct honour as the 1st Airborne Division commander, Major-General Frederick Browning, pointed out in a signal to the brigade, as "Such distinctions given by the enemy are seldom won in battle except by the finest fighting troops." This title was later officially confirmed by General Sir Harold Alexander, commanding the 18th Army Group, and applied henceforth to all British airborne troops. Lieutenant Colonel Terence Otway, who compiled the official history of the British Army's airborne forces during the Second World War, analysed the brigades' actions throughout the campaign. Of the brigades' airborne operations, he stated that the missions conducted by 1st and 2nd Parachute Battalions were "severely handicapped" by a lack of aerial photography and a shortage of maps, as well as the lack of experience on the part of the American air crews who dropped both battalions at the beginning of their missions, causing highly inaccurate and dispersed drops. He also believed that a "lack of an expert in airborne matters at either Allied Forces Headquarters or First Army" ensured that the 1st Parachute Brigade was not used as efficiently as they might have been, and that this lack of expertise meant that logistical and planning arrangements before each mission could have been better.

He also argued that the brigade suffered from a lack of light anti tank weapons, as well as there being no fourth company in a battalion; the absence of the latter was a "serious handicap" to each battalion, especially when surrounded by enemy forces. Otway considered the brigade to have performed its ground role of day and night patrols well, but was unaccustomed to cooperating with other arms, particularly artillery and armour, because of a lack of training, and was forced to learn these skills during combat. It also suffered from a lack of reinforcements, as high physical and mental standards during airborne training led to a small pool of reinforcements that was easily depleted, as well as the absence of its own transport, forcing the brigade to rely on captured enemy vehicles and pack animals. Finally, Otway argued that "it was most uneconomical and inefficient to employ a parachute brigade in ground operations" unless it was expanded with sufficient transport and extra personnel, as well as possessing a superior officer who understood the specialised role the brigade played and could advise on how to effectively use it.

== Bibliography ==
- Atkinson, Rick (2002). An Army At Dawn: The War in North Africa 1942–1943. Henry Holt & Company LLC. ISBN 0-8050-7448-1.
- Doherty, Richard (1994). Only the Enemy in Front: The Recce Corps at War 1940–1946. BCA. ISBN 1-871085-18-7.
- Flanagan, E. M. Jr (2002). Airborne – A Combat History of American Airborne Forces. The Random House Publishing Group. ISBN 0-89141-688-9.
- Ford, Ken (1999). Battleaxe Division. Stroud: Sutton Publishing. ISBN 0-7509-1893-4.
- Frost, Major-General John (1994). A Drop Too Many. Leo Cooper. ISBN 0-85052-391-5.
- Harclerode, Peter (2005). Wings Of War – Airborne Warfare 1918–1945. Weidenfeld & Nicolson. ISBN 0-304-36730-3.
- Messenger, Charles (1985). The Commandos 1940–1946. William Kimber. ISBN 0-7183-0553-1.
- Otway, Lieutenant-Colonel T. B. H. (1990). The Second World War 1939–1945 Army – Airborne Forces. Imperial War Museum. ISBN 0-901627-57-7.
- Saunders, Hilary St. George (1972). The Red Beret – The Story Of The Parachute Regiment 1940–1945. White Lion Publishers Ltd. ISBN 0-85617-823-3.
- Thompson, Major-General Julian (1990). Ready for Anything: The Parachute Regiment at War. Fontana. ISBN 0-00-637505-7.
- Watson, Bruce Allen (2007) [1999]. Exit Rommel: The Tunisian Campaign, 1942–43. Stackpole Military History Series. Mechanicsburg, Pennsylvania: Stackpole Books. ISBN 978-0-8117-3381-6.
