= 1st Parachute Brigade (United Kingdom) =

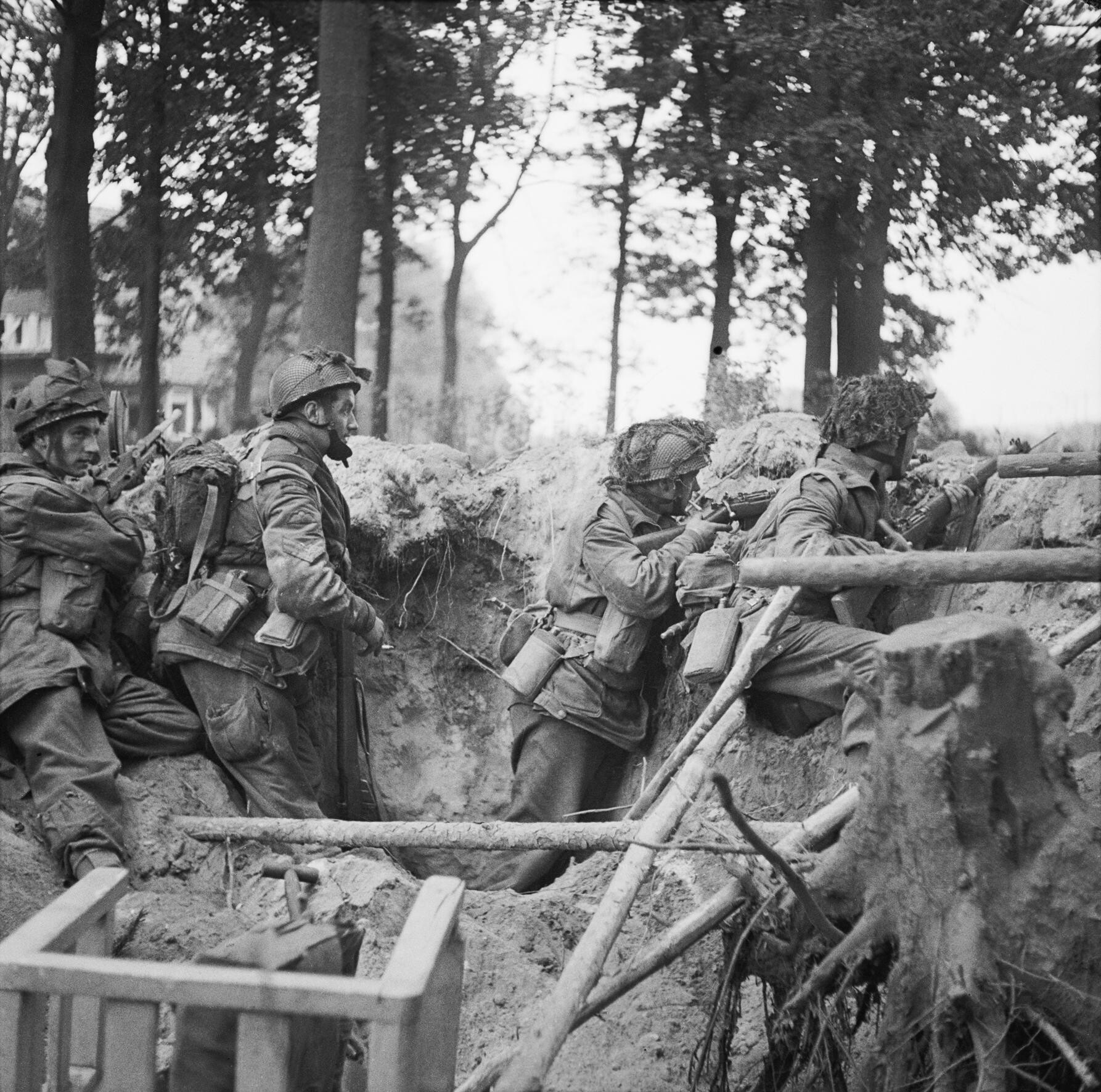
- Men of the 1st Parachute Brigade during the Battle of Arnhem, part of Operation Market Garden, September 1944.
- Active: 1941–1948
- Country: United Kingdom
- Branch: British Army
- Type: Airborne forces
- Role: Parachute infantry
- Size: Brigade
- Part of: 1st Airborne Division; 6th Airborne Division
- Nickname: Red Devils
- Colors: Maroon
- Engagements: Operation Biting; Operation Torch; British airborne operations in North Africa; Operation Fustian; Battle of Arnhem; Palestine

Commanders
- Notable commanders: Sir Richard Gale; Sir Gerald Lathbury; James Hill

Insignia
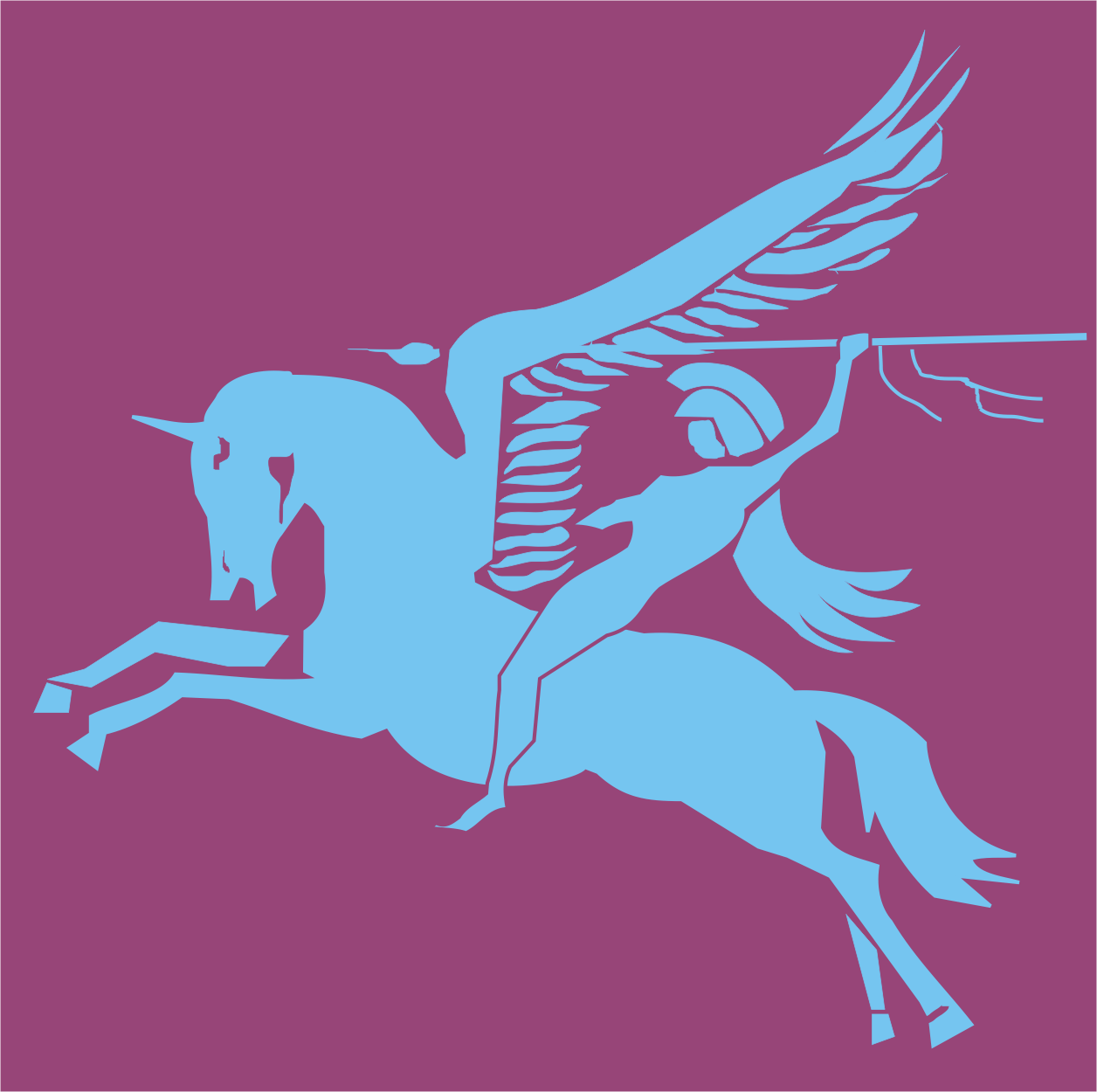
- The emblem of British Airborne Forces, Bellerophon riding the flying horse Pegasus

The 1st Parachute Brigade, or the Red Devils, was an airborne forces brigade formed by the British Army during the Second World War. As its name indicates, the unit was the first parachute infantry brigade formation in the British Army.

Formed from three parachute battalions as well as support units and assigned to the 1st Airborne Division, the brigade first saw action in Operation Biting – a raid on a German radar site at Bruneval on the French coast. They were then deployed in the Torch landings in Algeria, and the following Tunisia Campaign, where it fought as an independent unit. In North Africa each of the brigade's three parachute battalions took part in separate parachute assaults. The brigade then fought in the front line as normal infantry until the end of the campaign, during which they earned the nickname the "Red Devils". Following the Axis surrender in North Africa, when 1st Airborne Division arrived in Tunisia the brigade once more came under its command. The brigade's next mission was Operation Fustian, part of the Allied invasion of Sicily. This was also the British Army's first brigade-sized combat parachute jump. Because of casualties sustained in Sicily, the brigade was held in reserve for the division's next action, Operation Slapstick, an amphibious landing at Taranto, part of the Allied invasion of Italy.

At the end of 1943, the brigade returned to England, in preparation for the invasion of North-West Europe. Not required during the Normandy landings, the brigade was next in action at the Battle of Arnhem, part of Operation Market Garden. Landing on the first day of the battle, the brigade objective was to seize the crossings over the River Rhine and hold them for forty-eight hours until relieved by the advancing XXX Corps, coming 60 miles (97 km) from the south. In the face of strong resistance elements, the brigade managed to secure the north end of the Arnhem road bridge. After holding out for four days, with their casualties growing and supplies exhausted they were forced to surrender. By this time the remainder of the brigade trying to fight through to the bridge had been almost destroyed and was no longer a viable fighting force.

Reformed after the battle, the brigade took part in operations in Denmark at the end of the war and then in 1946 joined the 6th Airborne Division on internal security duties in Palestine. Post-war downsizing of the British Army reduced their airborne forces to a single brigade and led to the 1948 dissolution of 1st Parachute Brigade.

== Formation history ==
=== Background ===
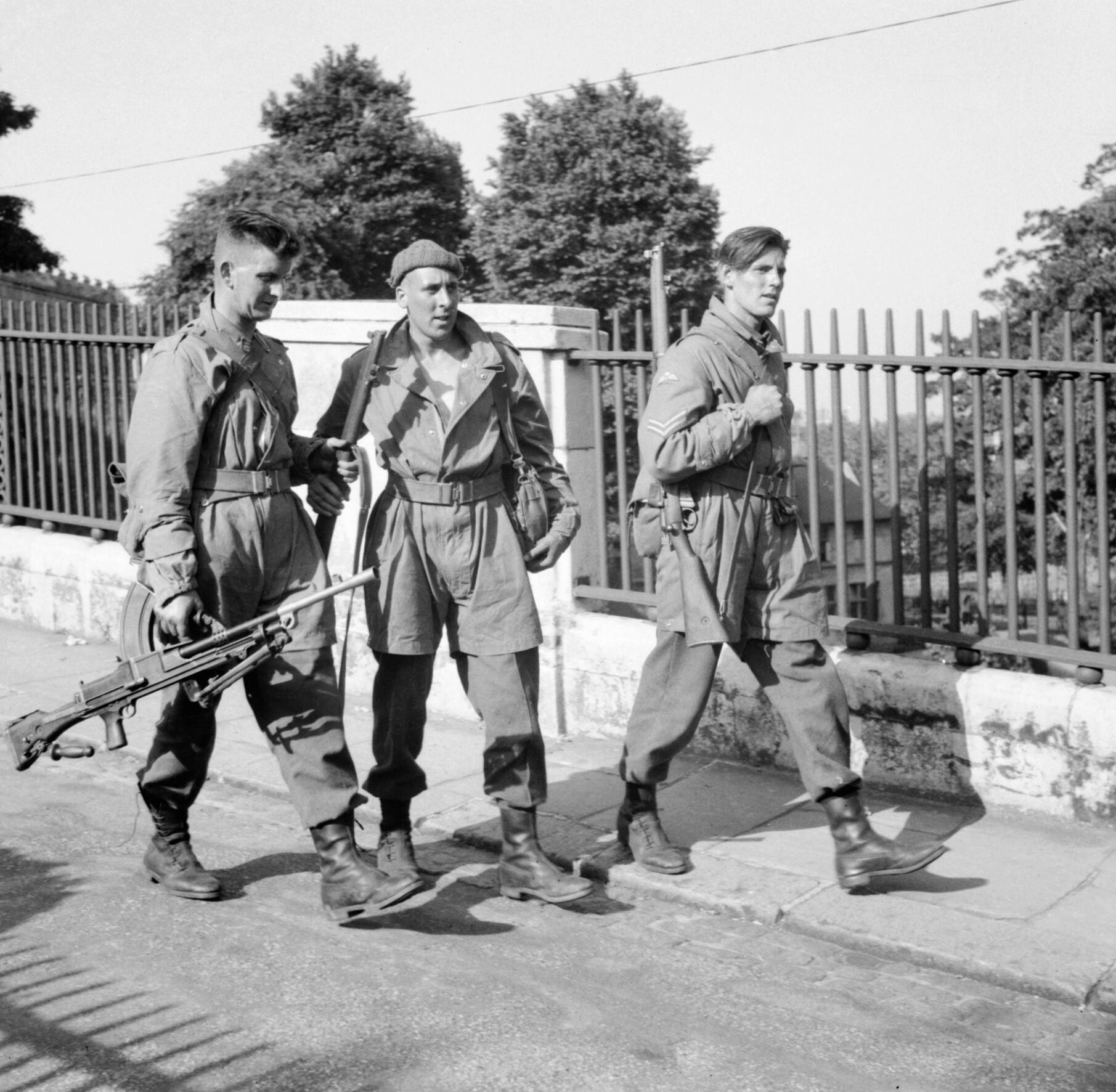
Three of the first British paratroopers, June 1941.

Impressed by the success of German airborne operations during the Battle of France, the British Prime Minister, Winston Churchill directed the War Office to investigate the possibility of creating a corps of 5,000 parachute troops. On 22 June 1940, No. 2 Commando was redeployed to parachute duties and on 21 November re-designated the 11th Special Air Service Battalion (later the 1st Parachute Battalion), with both a parachute and glider wing, the men of which took part in the first British airborne operation, Operation Colossus, on 10 February 1941. The success of the raid prompted the War Office to expand the airborne forces, setting up the Airborne Forces Depot and Battle School in Derbyshire in April 1942, and creating the Parachute Regiment as well as converting several infantry battalions into airborne battalions in August 1942. This resulted in the formation of the 1st Airborne Division with the 1st Parachute Brigade and the 1st Airlanding Brigade. Its commander Major-General Frederick Arthur Montague Boy Browning, expressed his opinion that the fledgling force must not be sacrificed in "penny packets" and urged the formation of further brigades.

All parachute forces had to undergo a twelve-day parachute training course at No. 1 Parachute Training School, RAF Ringway. Initial parachute jumps were from a converted barrage balloon and finished with five jumps from an aircraft. (Note: Barrage balloons were used to speed up training jumps and meet the target of 5,000 trained parachutists.) Anyone failing to complete a descent was returned to his old unit. Those men who successfully completed the parachute course were presented with their maroon beret and parachute wings.

Airborne soldiers were expected to fight against superior numbers of the enemy armed with heavy weapons, including artillery and tanks. Training was as a result designed to encourage a spirit of self-discipline, self-reliance and aggressiveness. Emphasis was given to physical fitness, marksmanship and fieldcraft. A large part of the training regime consisted of assault courses and route marching while military exercises included capturing and holding airborne bridgeheads, road or rail bridges and coastal fortifications. At the end of most exercises, the battalions would march back to their barracks. An ability to cover long distances at speed was also expected: airborne platoons were required to cover a distance of 50 miles (80 km) in twenty-four hours, and battalions 32 miles (51 km). This ability was demonstrated in April 1945. When the 3rd Parachute Brigade advanced 15 miles (24 km) in twenty-four hours, which included eighteen hours of close-quarters fighting. In the same month the 5th Parachute Brigade marched 50 miles (80 km) in seventy-two hours, during which they also carried out two night time assaults.

=== Formation ===
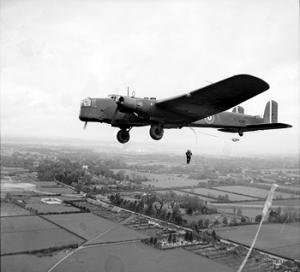
Parachute troops jumping from an Armstrong Whitworth Whitley near Windsor in England.

Brigadier Richard N. Gale, who would later command the 6th Airborne Division, took command of the 1st Parachute Brigade on its formation in September 1941. A triangular brigade formation with three battalions, Gale decided that rather than dividing the 11th Special Air Service Battalion among the brigade's battalions, he would keep the already trained unit together. On 15 September it was renamed the 1st Parachute Battalion, which, together with the newly raised 2nd and 3rd Parachute Battalions, now formed the 1st Parachute Brigade. These battalions were formed from volunteers aged between twenty-two and thirty-two years of age. Only men in infantry units were selected and only ten men from any one unit were allowed to leave. Early in 1942 the brigade was joined by the 4th Parachute Battalion, the 16th (Parachute) Field Ambulance, and the 1st (Parachute) Squadron, Royal Engineers (RE). The 4th Parachute Battalion left the brigade in July to become the first battalion in the 2nd Parachute Brigade.

By 1944, the brigade had increased in size and now comprised the 1st, 2nd, 3rd Parachute battalions, the 16th (Parachute) Field Ambulance and the 1st (Parachute) Squadron Royal Engineers (RE) as well as the 3rd (Airlanding) Light Battery Royal Artillery (RA) with 75 mm howitzers, 1st (Airlanding) Anti-Tank Battery RA with 6 pounder and 17 pounder guns along with a Royal Army Service Corps (RASC) detachment.

After the war the brigade comprised the 1st, 2nd, 17th Parachute Battalions and the 16th (Parachute) Field Ambulance. The 3rd Parachute Battalion had left to join the 3rd Parachute Brigade, replacing the 1st Canadian Parachute Battalion, who had returned to Canada at the cessation of hostilities. The 1st Airborne Division was disbanded in November 1945, and the brigade assigned to the 6th Airborne Division in Palestine. In 1946, the 17th Parachute Battalion amalgamated with the 7th (Light Infantry) Parachute Battalion retaining the number of the senior unit. The brigade formation changed again in 1948. Further amalgamations and the general reduction in the post war British Army resulted in the brigade being formed from the 1st Parachute Battalion, the amalgamated 2nd/3rd Parachute Battalion and the amalgamated 8th/9th Parachute Battalion. By July 1948, the 6th Airborne Division had been withdrawn to England and disbanded, leaving the 2nd Parachute Brigade as the only regular British Army parachute formation.

== Operational history ==
=== Bruneval ===
The Bruneval raid or Operation Biting in February 1942 was one of the first missions planned by Combined Operations Headquarters that used all three of the British Armed Forces. An attacking force from 'C' Company, 2nd Parachute Battalion would be parachuted into France by the Royal Air Force (RAF) and later evacuated by the Royal Navy. Their objective was a German Würzburg radar station on the coast of France, which British scientists wanted to examine.

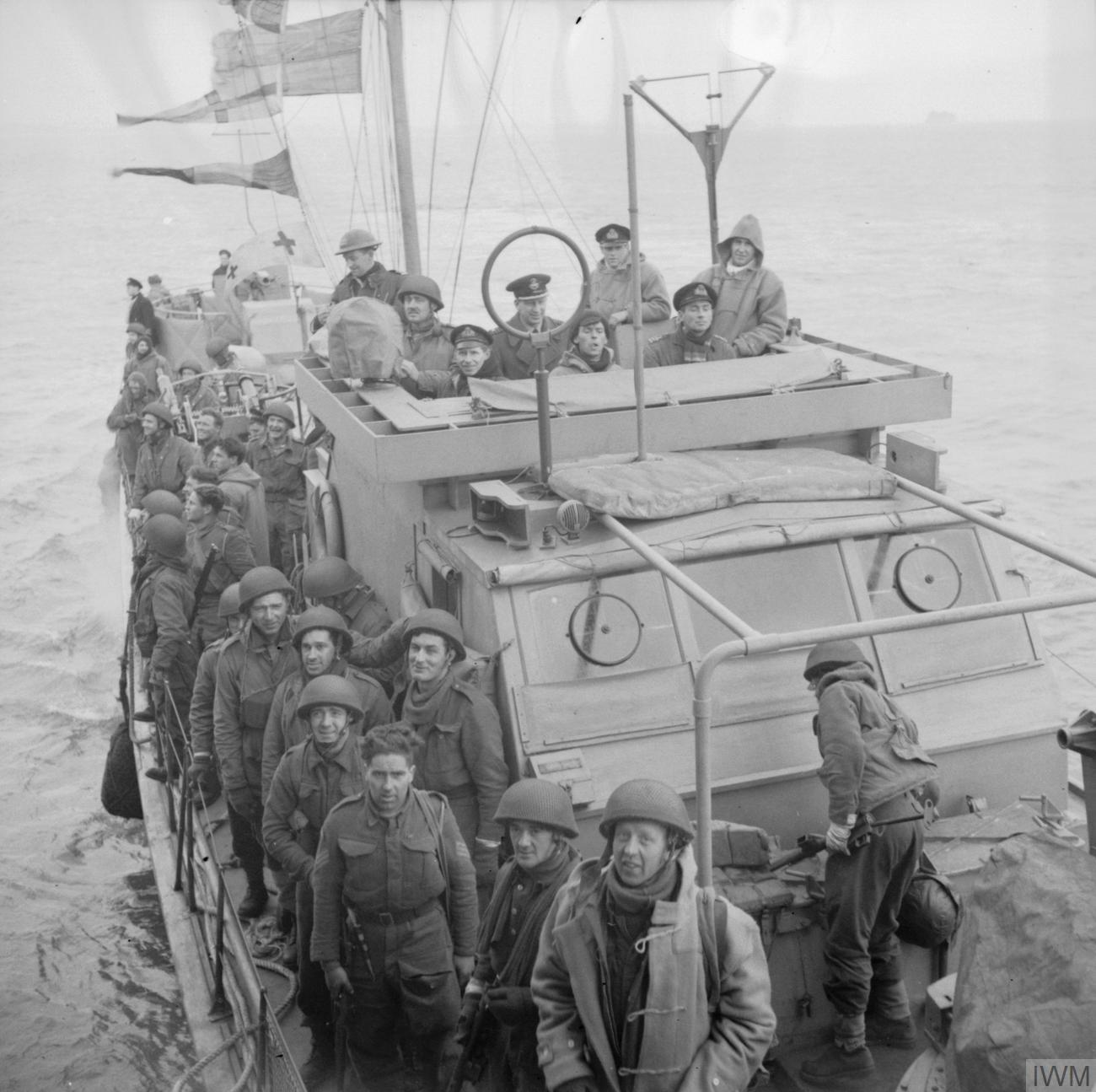
Men of 'C' Company, 2nd Parachute Battalion returning from the Bruneval raid.

On 27 February, in ideal tide and weather conditions, the raid was commanded by Major John D. Frost. A group of forty men would attack machine-guns on the cliffs overlooking the evacuation beach and then advance to Bruneval village. Another fifty-five men in an assault group would attack the radar station and forty men would set up a blocking position to prevent German reinforcements reaching the radar site. The parachute drop was mostly successful with half of the first group missing the drop zone (DZ) by 2 miles (3.2 km). After capturing the radar and other installations, the assault group dismantled the equipment then withdrew towards the beach. They were intercepted en route by the cliff machine guns which had not yet been cleared and suffered some casualties. When the delayed first group arrived, they managed to neutralize the enemy machine guns and by 02:15 the company had mustered on the beach to wait for the navy. Despite some initial problems caused by a lack of experience in combined operations, the troops were successfully evacuated with losses of three men killed and seven wounded.

The success of the Bruneval raid was reported in the British media for several weeks while Winston Churchill, who had taken a personal interest in the raid, assembled the War Cabinet on 3 March to hear from Major Frost and several other officers who had taken part. On 15 May 1942 a special supplement to the London Gazette carried the announcement of nineteen decorations for the mission, including a Military Cross for Frost.

=== North Africa ===
In November 1942, the brigade now commanded by Brigadier Edwin Flavell, was detached from 1st Airborne Division, to take part in Operation Torch, the Allied landings in French North Africa.

On 11 November, the first major British parachute landing was made by the 3rd Parachute Battalion, which without its 'A' Company, flew from England via Gibraltar in a fleet of American piloted Douglas Dakotas. (Note: The lack of transport aircraft hampered every British airborne operation of the war. However the Air Ministry had ordered in 1941, that all Royal Air Force bombers must have equipment fitted for towing gliders and Albemarle, Halifax and Stirling bombers were to be able to conduct parachute operations. It was the Commander-in-Chief RAF Bomber Command Arthur Harris, who refused to divert aircraft from the strategic bombing campaign, to transport troops.) Their objective, the airfield at Bône, turned out to be deserted and was secured with no opposition. No. 6 Commando and a flight of RAF Spitfires reinforced the battalion later the same day. The following day the rest of the brigade who had travelled by sea arrived at Algiers. During the next airborne mission on 16 November, the 1st Parachute Battalion secured an important road junction near Souk el Arba, 90 miles (140 km) west of Tunis then the next day ambushed a German convoy and were involved in several small battles. The Commanding Officer (CO) Lieutenant Colonel James Hill was wounded attacking an Italian position and replaced by his second-in-command, Alastair Pearson.

British Paratroops in North Africa.

On 29 November the 2nd Parachute Battalion, now commanded by John Frost, parachuted onto an airfield at Depienne, 30 miles (48 km) south of Tunis. The airfield was deserted so Frost marched the battalion 10 miles (16 km) to a second airfield at Oudna. Due to postponement of their advance, the First Army did not relieve the battalion as planned and instead it became trapped 50 miles (80 km) behind the German lines, where Frost was informed by radio that they had been written off. After ambushing an advancing German formation, the battalion were attacked by a second German unit and surrounded. On 1 December the Germans attacked with infantry, armour and artillery, almost wiping out 'C' Company and causing heavy casualties in the rest of the battalion. Frost ordered the battalion to disperse into company groups and head for the Allied lines. On 3 December, the surviving 180 men reached safety at Majaz al Bab. With no more opportunities for parachute operations, the brigade fought in the front line as normal infantry. In February they held the right flank of the Allied line at Bou Arada and on the night of 2/3 February, the 1st Battalion, along with a French Foreign Legion unit, captured the Jebel Mansour heights and were then subjected to constant shelling and infantry attacks. After three days without relief, their almost ammunition expended, and having suffered 200 casualties, they were forced to withdraw. This was followed by the brigade fighting two fierce engagements at Tamera and checking the German offensive of Operation Ochsenkopf. When the Allied advance began again after the winter rains, the brigade was assigned to the force tasked with capturing Bizerta on 17 March. The remaining Axis forces surrendered on 13 May 1943 bringing the Tunisian campaign to an end with a cost to the 1st Parachute Brigade of 1,700 killed, wounded or missing. They had nevertheless proved themselves in combat and been nicknamed the Red Devils by the German forces they had fought against. (Note: Lieutenant-General Frederick Browning pointed out to the brigade that this was an honour, as "distinctions given by the enemy are seldom won in battle except by the finest fighting troops." Following official confirmation by General Sir Harold Alexander, the title was thereafter applied to all British airborne troops. A demonstration of the respect in which the Germans held the Red Devils occurred when a train carrying the 1st and 2nd Battalions to Algiers passed a large prisoner of war camp. The Germans spotting their red berets, started cheering, and over a thousand prisoners ran towards the train throwing their own hats in the air.)

During its time in Tunisia, the 1st Parachute Brigade adopted the phrase “Waho Mohammed!” along with all other British airborne units as its unofficial battlecry, which it would use all the way through the war to the Battle of Arnhem.

=== Sicily ===
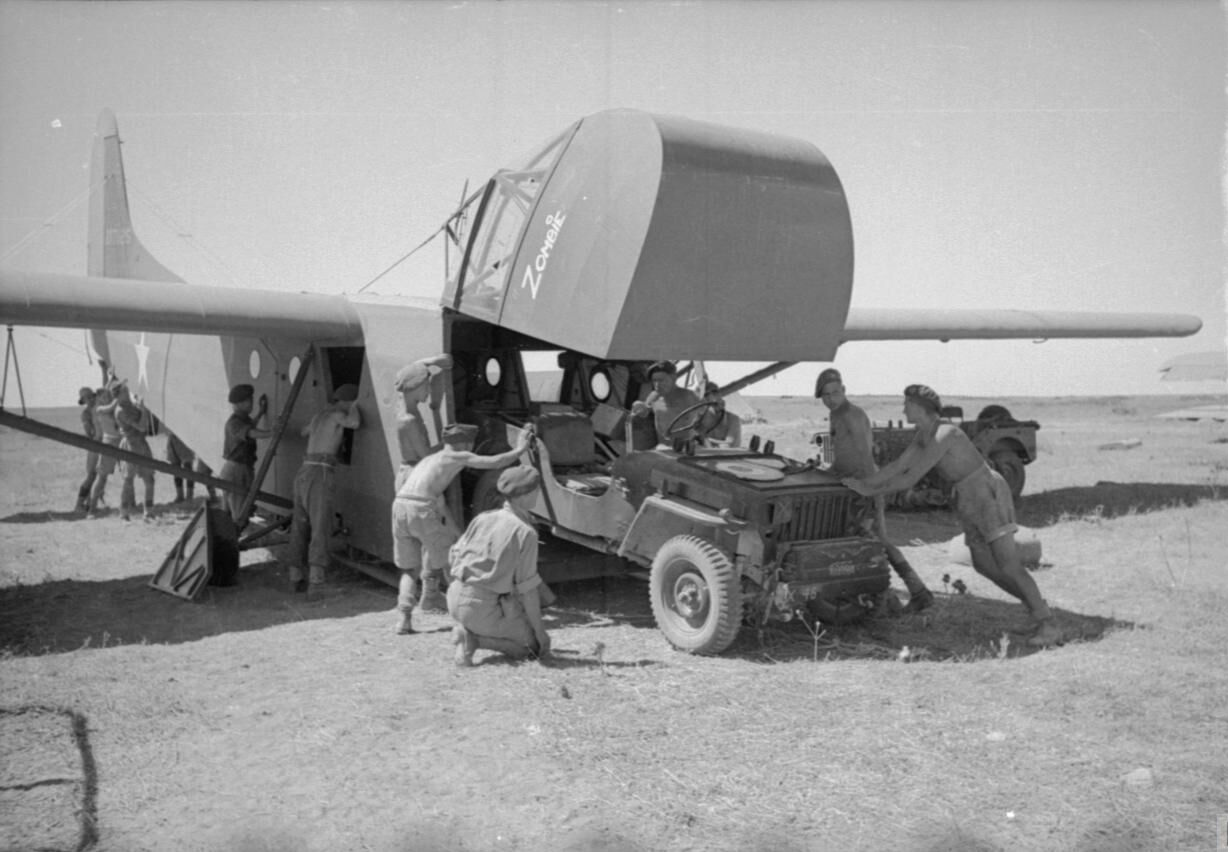
A jeep being loaded into a Waco Hadrian glider. While the Horsa glider could accommodate two jeeps or a jeep and gun or trailer, the Waco could only take one of each.

Immediately before the Axis surrender in April 1943, the 1st Airborne Division, now commanded by Major-General George Hopkinson, arrived in North Africa, and the 1st Parachute Brigade once again came under their command for further operations in Sicily. The invasion of Sicily was to be carried out by General Bernard Montgomery's Eighth Army landing in the east and Lieutenant General George S. Patton's U.S. Seventh Army coming ashore in the west. These seaborne landings were to be supported by airborne assaults whereby the U.S. 82nd Airborne Division would support the Americans and the 1st Airborne Division the British. The British airborne assault was divided into brigade-sized operations: Operation Ladbroke by the 1st Airlanding Brigade took place on the night of 9/10 July, and Operation Fustian by the 1st Parachute Brigade on the night of 13/14 July. A third operation to drop 2nd Parachute Brigade beside Augusta on the night of 10/11 July (Operation Glutton) was cancelled.

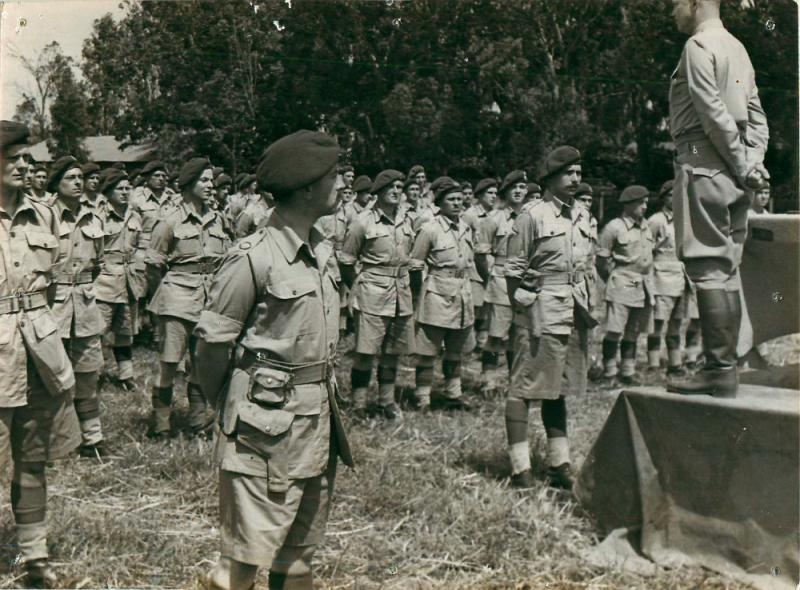
General Dwight D. Eisenhower, standing from a raised platform, addresses officers and men of the 1st Parachute Brigade, sometime in either 1942 or 1943.

Now under the command of Brigadier Gerald Lathbury, 1st Parachute Brigade's objective in Sicily was the Primosole bridge across the Simeto River, south of Catania, the only crossing point that gave the Eighth Army access to the Catania plain. Once they had captured the bridge, the brigade were to hold out until relieved by Major-General Sidney C. Kirkman's 50th (Northumbrian) Infantry Division, reinforced by the 4th Armoured Brigade advancing from the landing beaches. Paratroops of the brigade would land on four DZs and the gliders at two landing zones (LZ). The 1st Parachute Battalion was divided into two groups that would land at DZs on both sides of the river and thereafter attack the bridge from both sides simultaneously–3rd Parachute Battalion would land on their own DZ north of the bridge and secure the high ground, while the 2nd Parachute Battalion did the same in the south.

At 19:30 on 12 July 1943 the brigade took off from North Africa Consisting of 105 Dakotas, eight of them towing Waco gliders and 11 Albemarles towing Horsa gliders, the gliders amongst other things transported the twelve anti-tank guns of the 1st (Airlanding) Anti-Tank Battery.

The brigade's first casualties occurred while they were still en route, when two Dakotas were shot down flying over an Allied convoy with another nine damaged and forced to turn back. When they reached the Sicilian coast, Axis anti-aircraft fire shot down thirty-seven and a further ten were damaged and forced to abort their mission. Of the surviving aircraft, only thirty-nine managed to drop their paratroops within .5 miles (0.80 km) of the correct DZ. Only four gliders arrived intact and those not shot down en route were destroyed while attempting to land. Despite these setbacks, the 250 surviving men of the 1st Parachute Battalion captured the bridge intact. The battalion commander, 28-year old Lieutenant Colonel Pearson, ordered his men to dig in on the north side of the river. Their only support weapons were three anti-tank guns, two 3 inch mortars and a Vickers machine gun. As they dug in, the men removed the demolition charges from the bridge such that even if they were forced off the bridge it could not be immediately destroyed.

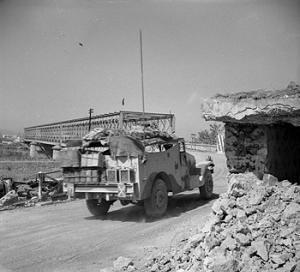
The brigade objective Primosole Bridge.

Unknown to the brigade, units of the German 1st Parachute Division had parachuted onto Catania airfield to reinforce the Italians guarding the bridge and quickly moved to regain the crossing. The German paratroops attacked at dawn. The defenders at the bridge held out all day against infantry, armour and attacks by aircraft. South of the bridge, the 2nd Parachute Battalion also under attack, were able to call on naval gunfire support from the 6 inch guns of the British cruiser HMS Mauritius, which stopped an assault that was about to overrun their position. The men from the 1st and 3rd Battalions, although initially forced across the river, still held the southern bank until dark when they withdrew to the 2nd Battalion's position.

To the south, the 50th (Northumbrian) Infantry Division, in the face of strong German resistance, had stopped for the night 1 mile (1.6 km) south of the 2nd Battalion. Gunfire was heard just south of the brigade position on the following morning whereupon Brigadier Lathbury sent out a patrol to investigate and they discovered it was from British guns. The leading elements of the 50th Division had finally made contact with the brigade. After two days fighting, the brigade's 4th Armoured and the 9th Battalion, Durham Light Infantry recaptured the bridge. Operations Ladbroke and Fustian had cost the British 1st Airborne Division 454 dead, 240 wounded and 102 missing.

=== England ===
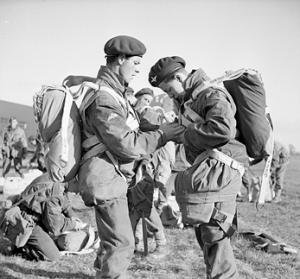
British paratroopers adjust their parachute harnesses during a large-scale airborne forces exercise in England, 22 April 1944.

The brigade returned to England in late 1943 and trained for operations in North-West Europe under the supervision of I Airborne Corps, commanded by Lieutenant-General Frederick Browning. Although they were not scheduled to take part in the Normandy landings, Operation Wastage was a contingency plan drawn up whereby all the 1st Airborne Division would be parachuted in to support any of the five invasion beaches if delays were experienced. (Note: Other missions planned in June and July 1944 were: Operation Reinforcement a parachute drop to the west of St Sauveur-le-Vicomte to support the U.S. 82nd Airborne Division. Operation Wild Oats a drop onto Carpiquet airfield. Operation Beneficiary supporting the U.S. XX Corps to capture St Malo. Operation Lucky Strike seizing the bridges crossing the River Seine at Rouen. Operation Sword Hilt cutting off the port of Brest and destroying the Morlaix viaduct. Operation Hands Up supporting the U.S. Third Army by seizing Vannes airfield. In August Operation Transfigure involved the 1st and 101st Airborne Divisions, with the British 52nd Infantry Division and 1st Independent Polish Para Brigade landing at Rambouillet St Arnoult to close the gap between Orléans and Paris. Operation Axehead using the same force to seize bridges over the River Seine in support of the 21st Army Group. Operation Boxer again using the same forces to seize Boulogne and attack V1 rocket sites. Near the end of August Operation Linnet, with the same units were to seize crossings over the Escaut, cutting off the retreating German armies. Operation Infatuate in early September involved I Airborne Corps, landing in the Scheldt estuary to threaten Antwerp.)

In early September, the brigade prepared for Operation Comet, during which the 1st Airborne Division's three brigades were to land in the Netherlands and capture three river crossings. The first of these was the bridge over the River Waal at Nijmegen, the second the bridge over the River Maas at Grave and finally the bridge over the River Rhine at Arnhem. The objective of the British 1st Parachute Brigade would be the bridge at Arnhem. Planning for Comet was well advanced when on 10 September the mission was cancelled. Instead, a new operation was proposed with the same objectives as Comet but to be carried out by three divisions of the First Allied Airborne Army, the British 1st and U.S. 82nd and 101st Airborne Divisions.

=== Arnhem ===
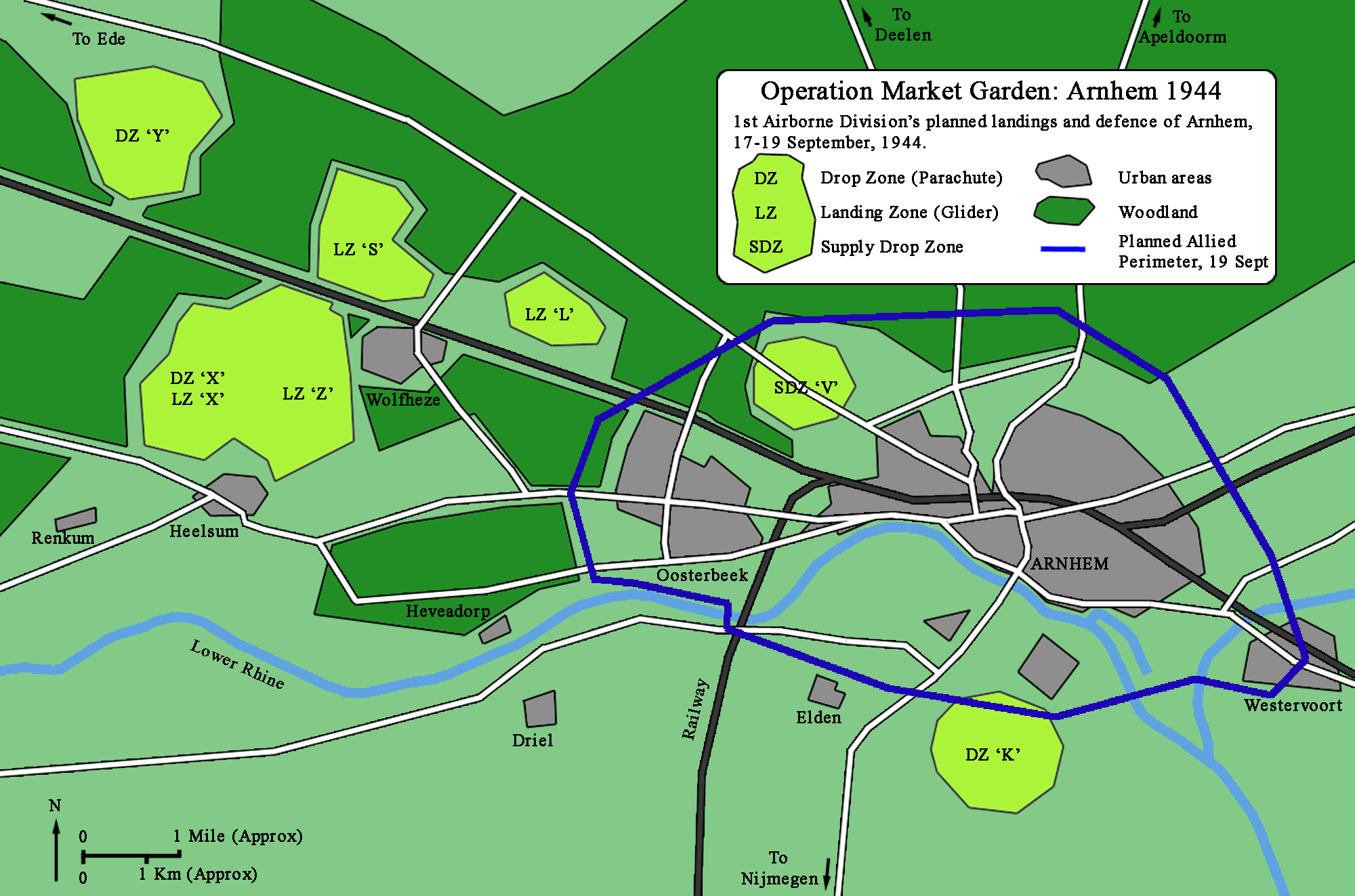
Map of the Arnhem area showing the planned drop and landing zones.

Landings by the 1st Allied Airborne Army's three divisions began in the Netherlands on 17 September 1944. Although the allocation of aircraft for each division was roughly similar, the 101st Airborne Division landing at Nijmegen would use only one lift. The 82nd Airborne Division at Grave required two lifts while the 1st Airborne Division at Arnhem would need three lifts. Whereas the two American divisions delivered at least three quarters of their infantry in their first lift, the 1st Airborne's similar drop used only half its capacity for infantry and the remainder to deliver vehicles and artillery.

The 1st Airborne Division had the required airlift capacity to deliver all three parachute brigades with their glider-borne anti-tank weapons or two of the parachute brigades and the airlanding brigade on day one. Instead, the vast majority of the division's vehicles and heavy equipment, plus the 1st Parachute Brigade, most of the 1st Airlanding Brigade and divisional troops were to be on the first lift, with the rest to follow the next day. Following the first lift, the airlanding brigade would remain at the landing grounds to defend them for the following day's lifts, while the parachute brigade set out alone to capture the bridges and ferry crossing on the River Rhine.

Planes carrying the brigade left England at around 09:45 and arrived over DZ 'X' at 13:00. After an uneventful landing the brigade, once organised, set off for Arnhem. The 2nd Parachute Battalion followed a southern route along the river Rhine, to the north 3rd Parachute Battalion took the Heelsum-Arnhem road through Oosterbeek, while the 1st Parachute Battalion initially remained in reserve at brigade headquarters. The 2nd Battalion, with 'A' Company leading, came under sporadic fire from pockets of German troops. 'C' Company were directed to capture the Arnhem railway bridge, but it was blown up just as they arrived. Pushing ahead, 'A' Company came under fire from German armoured cars and discovered that the central span of the pontoon bridge was missing. Entering Arnhem as night fell, the leading battalion elements reached the main road bridge at 21:00. Having secured the northern end of the bridge, attempts to capture the southern end were repulsed and the battalion started to fortify the houses and dig in. Following behind, other units of the brigade started to arrive, including a troop of guns from 1st (Airlanding) Anti-Tank Battery, brigade headquarters without the brigadier, part of the 1st Airborne Reconnaissance Squadron, and detachments of Royal Engineers and Royal Army Service Corps men. In total about 500 men were now at the bridge.

A lucky break allowed 3rd Battalion to ambush the staff car carrying Generalmajor Friedrich Kussin, the German commandant of Arnhem, and kill him and his driver. Nevertheless, most of the battalion had been stopped by the Germans in Oosterbeek while 'C' Company had entered Arnhem but were halted on the road leading to the bridge. At 15:30 the 1st Parachute Battalion were released from the reserve and directed along the Ede-Arnhem road. Here they first encountered German armoured vehicles and a column of five tanks and fifteen half-tracks, which were engaged by the battalion. They continued fighting their way forward, and by morning had reached the outskirts of Arnhem. By this time around a quarter of the battalion had been killed, wounded or were missing. Before this, at nightfall, Brigadier Lathbury had contacted Lieutenant-Colonel Frost in command at the bridge and informed him the brigade would stay put during the night and attempt to reach him in the morning.

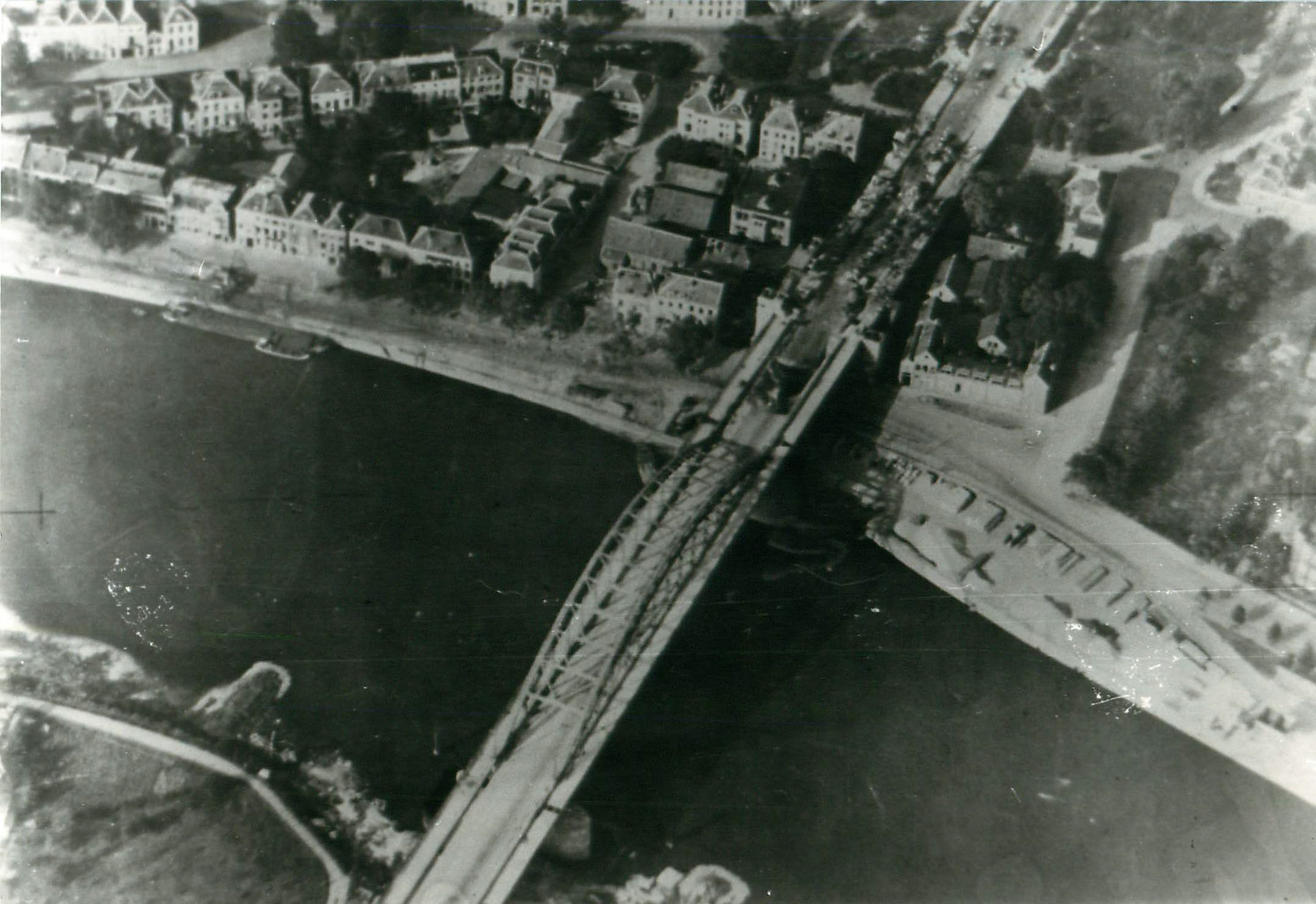
The bridge on the morning of Monday 18. Wreckage from that morning's battle litters the northern end.

At dawn on the second day, the defenders on the bridge saw a small convoy of trucks approaching at some speed from the south, which at first they misidentified as the British XXX Corps. That they were enemy trucks did not become apparent until they were on the bridge whereupon the defenders opened fire and destroyed the convoy. Soon afterwards, German infantry and armour approached the bridge from the east. One tank reached the space under the bridge before it was destroyed by one of the 6 pounder anti-tank guns. At 09:00, thirty armoured cars, half-tracks and trucks from the 9th SS Panzer Division attempted to rush the bridge from the south. The first five armoured cars, using the wrecks of the dawn convoy as cover and with the element of surprise, managed to cross unscathed. The rest of the force was engaged and twelve of their vehicles destroyed with the survivors returning to the southern bank. All day long, the force at the bridge came under fire from mortars and anti-aircraft guns positioned south of the river and were subject to probing infantry and armour attacks.

On the outskirts of Arnhem, 1st Battalion, which had been joined by Headquarters Company, 3rd Battalion, unsuccessfully attempted to fight through to the bridge then moved south in an attempt to flank the German line. They eventually ended up beside the river, whereafter 3rd Battalion advanced 2.5 miles (4.0 km) along the bank until daylight revealed their position to the Germans. Divisional commander Major-General Roy Urquhart and Brigadier Lathbury accompanied 3rd Battalion until Lathbury was shot and wounded. Due to his injuries, they were unable to move him and he was left in the care of a Dutch family. The 1st and 3rd Battalions spent all day trying to force a way through to the bridge. By nightfall they had failed and the strength of both battalions was reduced to around 100 men.

Another attempt to reach the bridge began at 03:45 on the third day, 19 September when the 1st and 3rd Battalions were joined by the 11th Parachute Battalion and the 2nd Battalion, South Staffordshire Regiment. By dawn, under intense fire from the German defenders, the attack had faltered whereupon the 11th Parachute Battalion, until then held in reserve, was ordered to carry out a left flanking assault on the German line. This last attempt to reach the defenders at the bridge was subsequently stopped on the orders of General Urquhart when he realised the futility of the battle. By this time the 1st Parachute Battalion had been reduced to forty men and the 3rd Parachute Battalion to around the same number.

With no word from the division or brigade Lieutenant-Colonel Frost assumed command of the brigade units at the bridge. With their casualties mounting and supplies of food and ammunition running low, a request for the force to surrender was rejected by Frost, who decided they would fight on.

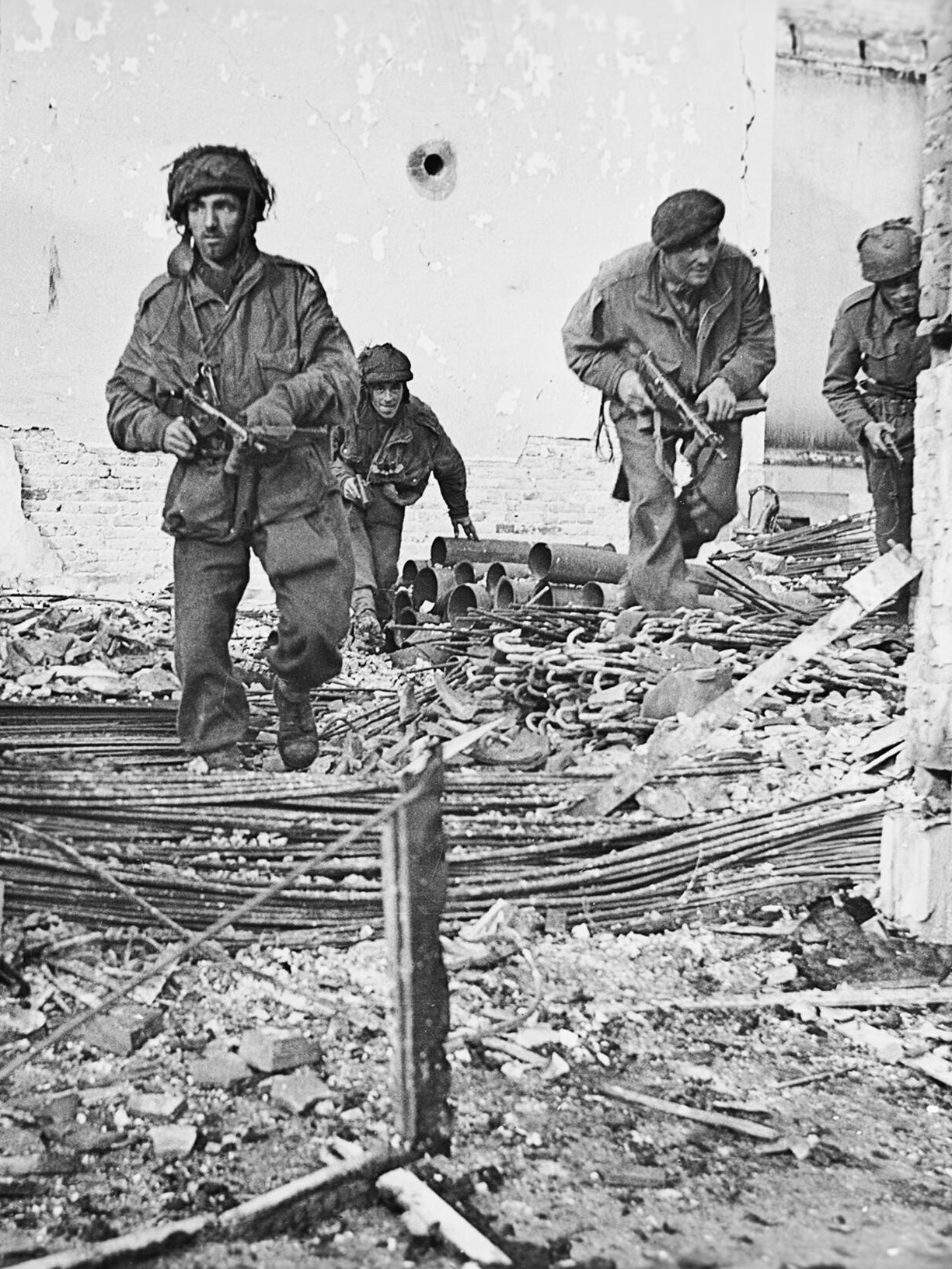
British paratroopers during the Battle of Arnhem.

By day four, 20 September, the brigade still holding out at the bridge had been split into two groups during the night by the Germans who had managed to infiltrate close enough to separate them into positions east and west of the bridge road. Any movement was subjected to machine-gun and sniper fire and they were under almost constant mortar and artillery attack. Added to this were probes by tanks and self propelled guns, which approached the defenders' buildings and opened fire at point blank range. The brigade, out of anti-tank ammunition, could do nothing to stop them in the east, but the 6 pounders in the west still proved an effective deterrent. During the day, Lieutenant John Grayburn of the 2nd Battalion was killed and later posthumously awarded the Victoria Cross for his bravery during the fighting at the bridge. That morning, communications with 1st Airborne Division were established and Frost, on asking for reinforcements and supplies, was informed that the division was surrounded at Oosterbeek and the brigade was on their own. Frost was later wounded and command of the brigade assumed by Major Frederick Gough of the reconnaissance squadron. By midday the brigade position was untenable and the last defenders were withdrawn into what had been the Headquarters Company, 2nd Battalion's position. By nightfall they were still holding out, and in the darkness some men tried unsuccessfully to break out. At dawn on day five, what was left of the brigade was forced to surrender.

=== Post war ===
By early May 1945, the 1st Parachute Brigade had been brought up to strength, albeit mainly with inexperienced replacements and the survivors of the 4th Parachute Brigade, which had been disbanded. On 4 May, the brigade was detached from 1st Airborne Division and 1st Parachute Battalion transported to Denmark for occupation duties while the rest of the brigade remained in Britain as a reserve formation. Without the brigade, the 1st Airborne Division deployed to Norway, but on their return were disbanded on 15 November 1945. The remaining airborne division, the 6th, went to serve in Palestine. On 8 April 1946, the brigade, now under command of Brigadier Hugh Bellamy, arrived in Palestine where it deployed in an internal security role. They replaced the 6th Airlanding Brigade, which was reformed as a normal infantry formation. Disbandment of the last brigade was overseen by its final commander Brigadier James Hill. Except for the three battalions of the 2nd Parachute Brigade in England, the remainder of the British airborne forces were disbanded. Between March and May 1948, the 6th Airborne Division was dismantled, with the men leaving for England to be demobbed. The 1st Parachute Battalion, along with divisional headquarters, were the last airborne units to leave Palestine, three days after the British mandate ended on 18 May.

After the brigade had been disbanded in June 1948, its battalions were reformed, by renumbering those in the 2nd Parachute Brigade. The 5th (Scottish) Parachute Battalion became the 2nd Parachute Battalion, the 4th/6th Parachute Battalion the 1st Parachute Battalion, and the 7th (Light Infantry) Parachute Battalion the 3rd Parachute Battalion. Finally, in July 1948, the 2nd Parachute Brigade was renumbered the 16th Parachute Brigade Group, taking its one and six numbers from the two wartime divisions.

== Notes ==
Footnotes

Citations
