= John Frost (British Army officer) =

British Army general (1912–1993)

Major-General John Frost CB DSO* MC DL
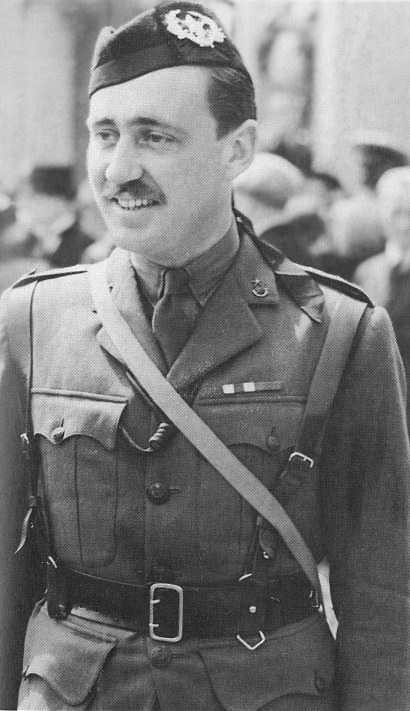
- Frost in 1942, wearing the uniform of his parent regiment, the Cameronians (Scottish Rifles).
- Born: 31 December 1912; Poona, Bombay Presidency, British India
- Died: 21 May 1993 (aged 80); West Sussex, England
- Military career
- Allegiance: United Kingdom
- Branch: British Army
- Service years: 1932–1968
- Rank: Major-General
- Nickname: "Johnny"
- Service number: 53721
- Units: Cameronians (Scottish Rifles); Parachute Regiment
- Commands: 52nd (Lowland) Infantry Division; 44th Parachute Brigade; 2nd Battalion, Parachute Regiment
- Conflicts: Second World War; Arab revolt in Palestine; Palestine Emergency; Malayan Emergency
- Awards: Companion of the Order of the Bath; Distinguished Service Order & Bar; Military Cross

Major-General John Dutton Frost, CB, DSO & Bar, MC, DL (31 December 1912 – 21 May 1993) was an airborne officer of the British Army, best known for being the leader of the small group of British airborne troops that actually arrived at Arnhem bridge during the Battle of Arnhem in Operation Market Garden, in the Second World War. He was one of the first to join the newly formed Parachute Regiment and served with distinction in many wartime airborne operations, such as in North Africa and Sicily and Italy, until his injury and subsequent capture at Arnhem. He retired from the army in 1968 to become a beef cattle farmer in West Sussex.

== Early life and military career ==
John Dutton Frost was born in Poona, British India, on 31 December 1912. He was the son of Frank Dutton Frost, a British Army officer, and his wife, Elsie Dora (née Bright). He was educated, initially, at Wellington College, Berkshire, but was transferred to Monkton Combe School, Somerset in 1929 due to lack of progress. He would later leave Monkton Combe School off his Who's Who entry.

On leaving Monkton he followed in his father's footsteps and joined the British Army. On graduation from the Royal Military College, Sandhurst on 1 September 1932, he was commissioned as a second lieutenant into the Cameronians (Scottish Rifles). He was promoted on 1 September 1935 to lieutenant. Frost served with his regiment's 2nd Battalion, then commanded by Lieutenant-Colonel Thomas Riddell-Webster, in the United Kingdom before the battalion, now commanded by Lieutenant-Colonel Douglas Graham, was sent to Palestine during the early stages of the Arab revolt. From 1938 to 1941 Frost worked with the Iraq Levies, receiving a promotion to captain on 1 September 1940.

== Second World War ==
=== Return to the United Kingdom ===
Returning to the United Kingdom in September 1941, Frost initially served with the 10th Battalion, Cameronians, a Territorial Army (TA) unit which formed part of the 45th Brigade of Major-General Philip Christison's 15th (Scottish) Infantry Division, before later volunteering to join the Parachute Regiment in the same year. He was posted to the 2nd Parachute Battalion, part of Brigadier Richard Gale's 1st Parachute Brigade, itself forming part of the 1st Airborne Division, whose General Officer Commanding (GOC) was Major-General Frederick Browning.

=== Operation Biting ===
Frost distinguished himself in Operation Biting, a raid to dismantle and steal the radar dish or components of the German Würzburg radar at Bruneval. The raid was the second time the fledgling British parachute regiment was called on. C Company under the then Major Frost was given the task and on 27 February 1942, 120 men landed. They met stiff opposition but succeeded in stealing the component as well as capturing a German radar technician. The operation lost three men killed, six wounded and six made prisoners of war. Prime Minister Winston Churchill applauded the raid and guaranteed further wartime operations for the paratroopers. Frost was awarded the Military Cross.

=== North Africa ===
During the Allied landings in North Africa British airborne units landed in Tunisia, which included the 1st Para Brigade, which was detached from the rest of the division and now commanded by Brigadier Edwin Flavell. At this time Frost, who was now an acting lieutenant-colonel and in command of his battalion, was tasked to attack enemy airfields near Depienne 30 miles south of Tunis. The airfields were found to be abandoned and the armour column they were supposed to meet up with at Oudna never arrived, leaving Frost's battalion 50 miles behind enemy lines. Heavily outnumbered and continuously attacked on their route out, they managed to fight their way back to Allied lines but lost 16 officers and 250 men. The battalion carried on fighting with the British First Army through to Tunis. For this action he was awarded his first Distinguished Service Order (DSO) on 11 February 1943.

=== Sicily and Italy ===
In 1943, Frost's battalion, with the rest of the 1st Parachute Brigade, now under Brigadier Gerald Lathbury, was landed in Sicily during Operation Husky with orders to capture a road bridge called Ponte di Primosole. The brigade was hopelessly scattered and the 295 officers and men who reached the bridge found themselves facing the German 4th Parachute Regiment and lost the bridge until the arrival of other Eighth Army units.

Frost's last action in this theatre was in Italy when the entire 1st Airborne Division, now commanded by Major-General Ernest Down (but replaced in January 1944 by Major-General Roy Urquhart) after Major-General George F. Hopkinson was killed in September 1943, landed at Taranto by sea.

=== Operation Market Garden ===
Frost is best known for his involvement in the Battle of Arnhem during Operation Market Garden. During this battle, Frost was to spearhead the 1st Airborne Division's assault on the bridge at Arnhem and hold it while the rest of the division made its way there. If all had gone to plan there would have been almost 9,000 men holding Arnhem bridge for the two days it was supposed to take Lieutenant-General Brian Horrocks's XXX Corps to reach them.

==== A Bridge Too Far ====
On 17 September 1944, as commander of the 2nd Parachute Battalion, Frost led a mixed group of about 745 lightly armed men who landed near Oosterbeek and marched into Arnhem. The battalion reached the bridge capturing the northern end, but Frost then found that his force was surrounded by the II.SS-Panzerkorps and cut off from the rest of 1st Airborne. Frost was in command during the fierce four-day battle that followed, in which the Germans rained artillery fire onto the paratroopers' positions, and sent tanks and infantry into some of the most intense fighting seen by either side, with very little mercy shown. The Germans were greatly surprised by the airborne forces' refusal to surrender and their continuous counterattacks. After a short truce on the third day, when 250 wounded were removed, the battle continued until the remaining paratroopers had run out of ammunition. There were around one hundred paratroopers left. The Battle of Arnhem became infamous, with the film "A Bridge Too Far" (1977), directed by Richard Attenborough and based on the book by Cornelius Ryan, depicting the urban fighting that took place near the Arnhem bridge, now known as the John Frostbrug (John Frost Bridge).

Following capture, Frost was held as a prisoner of war in Oflag IX-A/H at Spangenberg castle. He was later moved to a hospital in Obermassfeldt. Frost was liberated when the area was overrun by American troops in March 1945.

On 20 September 1945, he was awarded a bar to his DSO for his leadership at Arnhem.

== Later life ==
Frost remained in the army after the war, during which time he commanded the 1st Airborne Division's Battle School and returned from Norway with the division, still under Major-General Urquhart, back to the United Kingdom, where it was disbanded. He later returned to the 2nd Parachute Battalion, which still formed part of the 1st Parachute Brigade but was transferred to the 6th Airborne Division. Frost led his old battalion during the Palestine Emergency (see 6th Airborne Division in Palestine). While in Palestine he met his future wife, Jean McGregor Lyle, who was there as a welfare worker; they married on 31 December 1947 and had two children, a son and a daughter. Returning to England in late 1946, he attended the Staff College, Camberley, and, after graduating, became a General Staff Officer Grade 2 (GSO2) with the 52nd (Lowland) Infantry Division, a TA formation, before serving as a GSO1 with the 17th Gurkha Division during the Malayan Emergency. Returning to the United Kingdom, he was, from 1955 to 1957, in command of the Support Weapons Wing of the School of Infantry. He then commanded the 44th Parachute Brigade, another TA formation, composed of part-time soldiers, before receiving promotion to temporary major-general on 11 October 1961, and returning to the 52nd Division, this time as its GOC, a post he would hold for nearly three years.

By the time of his retirement from the army in 1968, Frost had attained the permanent rank of major-general and in addition to his wartime decorations, had been appointed a Companion of the Order of the Bath in the 1964 New Year Honours.

In 1982, Frost was appointed a deputy lieutenant in the County of West Sussex where he had taken up beef cattle farming on retirement. He was the subject of an episode of the television programme This Is Your Life on 6 April 1977.

Frost died on 21 May 1993 at the age of 80. He was buried in the churchyard of the demolished Church of the Good Shepherd, Iping Marsh, in West Sussex.

== In popular culture ==
In the 1977 film, A Bridge Too Far, Frost is portrayed by actor Anthony Hopkins.

== Biographies, memorials and depiction in the media ==
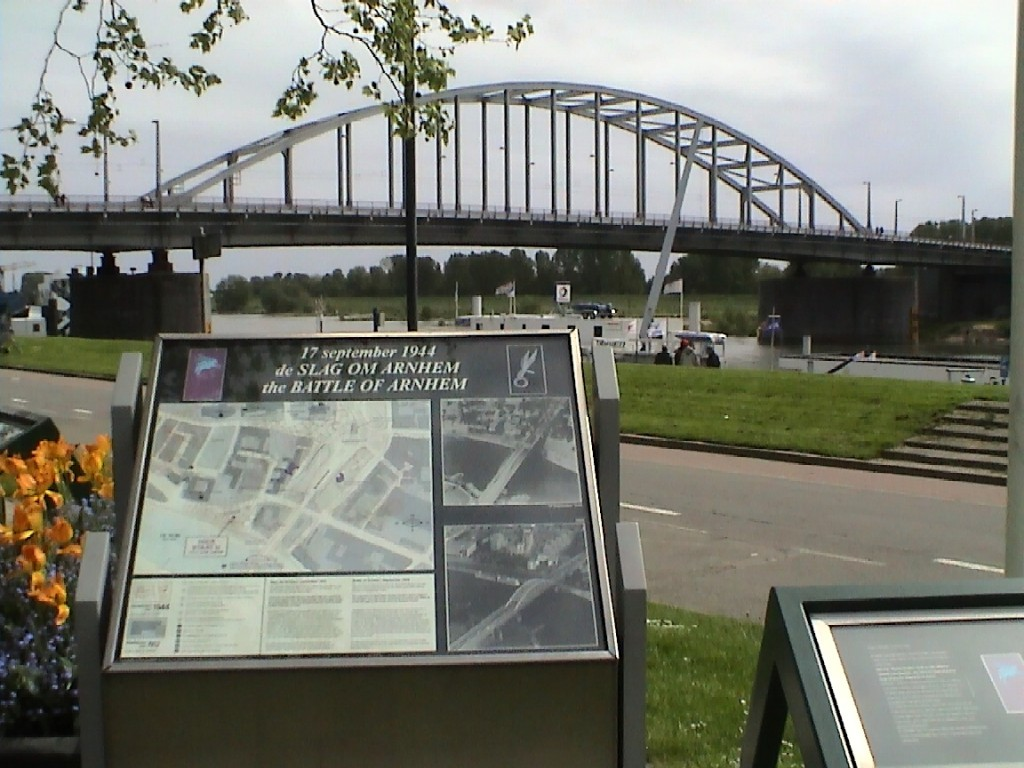
The John Frost Bridge, as seen from the memorial.

In 1945, the British Army Film and Photographic Unit (AFPU) and J. Arthur Rank Organisation initiated production on a documentary feature film, under the title Theirs is the Glory, about Operation Biting/the Battle of Arnhem, directed by Brian Desmond Hurst. The film included fictionalised recreations of events from the battle. John Frost was among 120 Arnhem veterans who played themselves in many scenes.

In 1974, Frost's role at Arnhem featured prominently in Cornelius Ryan's best-selling non-fictional book A Bridge Too Far. In 1976, Frost acted as a military consultant to Richard Attenborough's film adaptation of Ryan's book. In the film Frost was portrayed by Anthony Hopkins.

The bridge over the Rhine at Arnhem was renamed John Frostbrug ("John Frost Bridge") in his honour in 1978, despite Frost's reported reluctance.

== Other works ==
- 1980: A Drop Too Many – autobiography (part 1)
- 1983: 2 PARA Falklands: The Battalion at War
- 1991: Nearly There – autobiography (part 2)

== Bibliography ==
- Warner, Philip (September 2004). "Frost, John Dutton (1912–1993)". Oxford Dictionary of National Biography (online ed.). Oxford University Press. doi:10.1093/ref:odnb/52059. (Subscription, Wikipedia Library access or UK public library membership required.)

Military offices
| Preceded by John Macdonald | GOC 52nd (Lowland) Infantry Division; 1961–1964 | Succeeded by Henry Leask |
