= Edwin Flavell (British Army officer) =

British Army officer

Brigadier Edwin Flavell DSO MC**
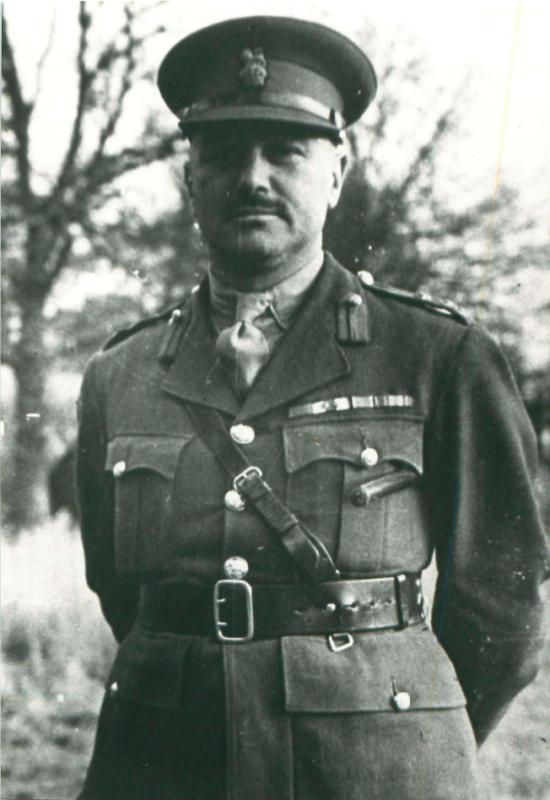
- Born: 22 February 1898; 15 Stansfield Road, Stockwell, London, England
- Died: 29 November 1993 (aged 95); Eastbourne Belmont Retirement Home, Pevensey Bay Road, Eastbourne, East Sussex, England
- Military career
- Allegiance: United Kingdom
- Branch: British Army
- Service years: 1914–1918; 1939–1945
- Rank: Brigadier
- Nickname: "Ted"
- Service number: 48661
- Units: East Surrey Regiment; Machine Gun Corps; Middlesex Regiment
- Commands: 70th (Young Soldiers') Battalion, Middlesex Regiment; 2nd Parachute Battalion; 1st Parachute Brigade; 3rd Parachute Brigade; 5th Parachute Brigade; 6th Airlanding Brigade
- Conflicts: World War I World War II
- Awards: Distinguished Service Order; Military Cross & Two Bars; Legion of Merit (United States)
- Other work: Deputy lieutenant of Middlesex (first appointed 1960). Provincial Grand Master of Berkshire (1967–1985).

Brigadier Edwin William Conquest Flavell DSO, MC & Two Bars (22 February 1898 – 29 November 1993) was a British Army officer who served in both World War I and World War II. He served with great distinction during the latter, where he commanded the 1st Parachute Brigade in North Africa and the 6th Airlanding Brigade in Normandy, before becoming Deputy Chief of Staff HQ First Allied Airborne Army.

== Family background ==
Flavell was born on 22 February 1898 at 15 Stansfield Road, Stockwell, London. (Note: The Daily Telegraph obituary, dated 22 December 1993, and most other sources, gives the place of birth as Cookham, Berks. The place of birth is verified from the birth certificate.) He was educated at King's College School in Wimbledon, London. Flavell died on 29 November 1993 aged 95. Some sources give 8 November or 1 December 1993 as the date of death.

He was the son of Edwin George Flavell and Emily Eliza Flavell (née Conquest) born 1870 and 1874 respectively.

The 1911 Census, dated 2 February, shows his father was a commercial clerk and that he had an older sister named Constance Lillian Flavell (1896–1978). Constance was a cashier in a drapery store or manufacturing outlet at the time. Edwin's younger brother, George Channell Flavell, was born in July 1911.

Edwin Flavell married Nora Alice Cooper in 1920, they had two sons and one daughter. Both of Edwin's sons served during World War II: Edwin James George "Ted" Flavell (1922–2014) was a Squadron Leader in the Royal Air Force and James Sydney Channel "Jim" Flavell (1924–2008) served as a 2nd Lieutenant in the 2nd Parachute Battalion – Middlesex Regiment. Both brothers were at the ill-fated Battle of Arnhem in 1944 where Jim was captured by Germans and remained a prisoner of war until 1945. In 1956, Ted carried out the first British air drop of an atomic bomb during Operation Buffalo at Maralinga, South Australia.

Edwin's father died at the age of 49 in 1920. Six years later his mother, Emily Eliza Flavell, and his younger brother George, emigrated from England to New Zealand.

Edwin Flavell married a second time in 1971 to Kathleen Emily Fenton.

== Military career ==
=== First World War ===
In 1914, during World War I, at the age of 17, Edwin William Conquest Flavell enlisted in the East Surrey Regiment and was commissioned as a second lieutenant five months later. In 1916 he transferred to the newly formed Machine Gun Corps, and in 1917 he was believed to be the youngest major serving in the Flanders area at the age of 20. He was wounded during the Battle of Cambrai in the same year, and by the end of the conflict had been awarded the Military Cross a total of three times (referred to as the Military Cross and two Bars). The first was awarded for taking command of an infantry company that had lost all of its officers; by his leadership the unit was able to continue advancing. The second (his first bar) was for conducting several personal reconnaissances of enemy positions. In mid-March 1918, Flavell was transferred from the 19th (Western) Division to the 42nd (East Lancashire) Division, where he took command of the 126th Machine Gun Company; one of the officers in the company was his future commanding officer, Lieutenant (later general) Richard Nelson Gale.

On 21 March the Germans launched Operation Michael, a major offensive against the British Army, and the 42nd Division moved into the frontline near Bapaume, replacing the 46th (North Midland) Division who had taken heavy casualties. The offensive was repulsed, and by the end of August the division had advanced towards the Hindenburg Line. Forming a part of the British Third Army, the division then made rapid advances towards Bapaume and by the end of September had reached the Hindenburg Line; on 27 September Flavell's brigade, the 126th (East Lancashire), was tasked with capturing Highland Ridge, near Havrincourt Wood. The next day, after the brigade had reached the top of the ridge, Gale's machine gun section sighted in on two German field guns moving parallel to their position; they sighted in on the horses leading the guns, but just before they could open fire, Flavell arrived. According to Gale, "Flavell could not resist and, firing one of the guns himself, he brought down the leading horses;" the crews fled and the section was able to capture the two guns. This action resulted in Flavell being awarded his third Military Cross (second bar).

=== Second World War ===
During the interwar period Flavell remained on the active list of the East Surrey Regiment, but became involved in the shipping industry with a business partner from the United States.

When the Second World War broke out in September 1939, Flavell was recalled to the British Army and subsequently given command of the 2/7th Middlesex Regiment and saw service during the Battle of France in 1940, and was then given the task of raising the 70th (Young Soldiers) Battalion, East Surrey Regiment.

On 22 June 1940, the Prime Minister, Winston Churchill, created the British airborne establishment when he directed the War Office in a memorandum to investigate the possibility of creating a corps of 5,000 parachute troops.

In 1941 the 1st Parachute Brigade was formed, with Brigadier Richard N. Gale, Flavell's former commanding officer, as its commander. Gale selected Flavell, now a colonel, to raise and then command the 2nd Parachute Battalion which would form part of the brigade. His adjutant was Captain John D. Frost, who would later become famous for commanding the battalion during the Battle of Arnhem; both men qualified as parachutists in October 1941. In January 1942 Flavell gave Frost command over Operation Biting, a raid on a radar station on the French coast near Bruneval; the raid, which took place in February, was successful and brought back vital technology.

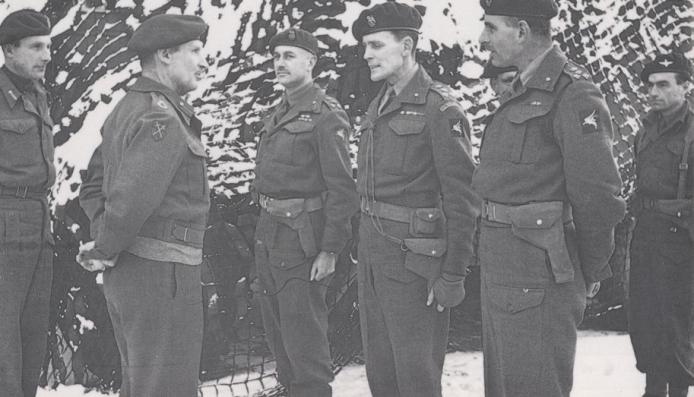
From left to right: Major General Eric Bols, Field Marshal Sir Bernard Montgomery, Brigadiers Edwin Flavell, James Hill, and Nigel Poett, and Lieutenant Colonel Napier Crookenden

In the spring of 1942 Gale was promoted to deputy director of staff duties at the War Office, and he passed command of the brigade over to Flavell. Flavell, promoted to brigadier, transferred command of 2nd Parachute Battalion to Major Gofton-Salmond, and in the beginning of November the brigade was sent to North Africa as part of Operation Torch. Because of a shortage of aircraft, the 3rd Parachute Battalion was forced to travel separately from the brigade, arriving on 11 November; the rest of the brigade, including Flavell, arrived the next day.

He commanded the brigade for the whole of the period that it fought in North Africa, and was awarded the Distinguished Service Order at the end of the brigade's service in the theatre; the citation stated that Flavell and the brigade had "fought magnificently and set a standard to the 1st Army difficult to emulate." Under his command the brigade had sustained 1,700 casualties and taken more than 3,500 Axis prisoners, as well as winning eight Distinguished Service Orders, fifteen Military Crosses, nine Distinguished Conduct Medals and twenty-two Military Medals. Flavell had a difficult time commanding the brigade while it was in North Africa. He was hampered by the fact that there were no senior officers who knew how to use airborne forces properly and efficiently, meaning that the airborne missions that were given to the brigade were often unsuitable to its abilities. The same problems occurred when it was used in a ground role, for which it was considered to be unsuited, and Flavell found it difficult to prevent this occurring.

The brigade ended its operations in North Africa in mid-April 1943, and Flavell left for England in June to take up a new command. He was replaced as commander of 1st Parachute Brigade by Brigadier Gerald W. Lathbury. He became commander, Airborne Establishments, which was tasked with promoting closer cooperation with the Royal Air Force as well as providing reinforcements for the 1st Airborne Division and aiding in the creation of the Polish 1st Independent Parachute Brigade.

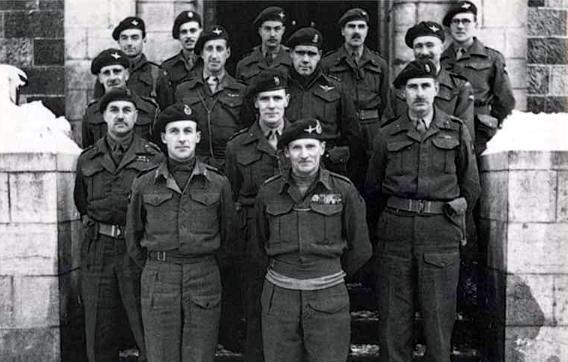
Field Marshal Montgomery and senior officers of the 6th Airborne Division in the Ardennes, January 1945. Stood first on the left in the second row is Brigadier Edwin Flavell.

Then on 12 June 1944, he was given command of the 6th Airlanding Brigade, part of the 6th Airborne Division, commanded by Gale, now a major general. On the night of 5 June the division conducted Operation Tonga, the British airborne portion of the Allied invasion of Normandy. As an airlanding brigade equipped with gliders, the brigade was the last unit belonging to the division to arrive, landing at 21:00 on 6 June in landing zone 'W' after it had been secured by the rest of the division.

Flavell continued to command the 6th Airlanding Brigade throughout the period that 6th Airborne Division fought in Normandy, as well as when the division fought in the Ardennes forest during the German offensive there in December 1944. He was involved with "Operation Market Garden" at Arnhem where his son, James, also fought and another son was involved towing the gliders for troop landings. He was then appointed as Deputy Chief of Staff HQ in First Allied Airborne Army, and subsequently made an Officer of the American Legion of Merit.

=== Postwar activities ===
Flavell retired from the British Army in 1945. In the 1945 general election, Flavell stood as the Conservative candidate for Hendon North in Middlesex, but was defeated by a slim margin. After this, he became involved in property development and also managing his own company. In 1948 he was appointed as Deputy Lieutenant for Middlesex, and some time later became the chairman of the County of Middlesex Territorial Army Association.

== Bibliography ==
- Dover, Major Victor (1981). The Sky Generals. Cassell. ISBN 0-304-30480-8.
- Frost, Major-General John (1994). A Drop Too Many. Leo Cooper. ISBN 0-85052-391-5.
- Gale, General Sir Richard (1968). Call to Arms: An Autobiography. Hutchinson & Co.
- Harclerode, Peter (2005). Wings Of War – Airborne Warfare 1918–1945. Weidenfeld & Nicolson. ISBN 0-304-36730-3.
- Otway, Lieutenant-Colonel T.B.H. (1990). The Second World War 1939-1945 Army - Airborne Forces. Imperial War Museum. ISBN 0-901627-57-7.
- Saunders, Hilary St. George (1972). The Red Beret – The Story Of The Parachute Regiment 1940-1945. White Lion Publishers Ltd. ISBN 0-85617-823-3.
- Thompson, Major-General Julian (1990). Ready for Anything: The Parachute Regiment at War. Fontana. ISBN 0-00-637505-7.
