= Richard Gale (British Army officer) =

British Army general (1896–1982)

General Sir Richard Gale GCB KBE DSO MC
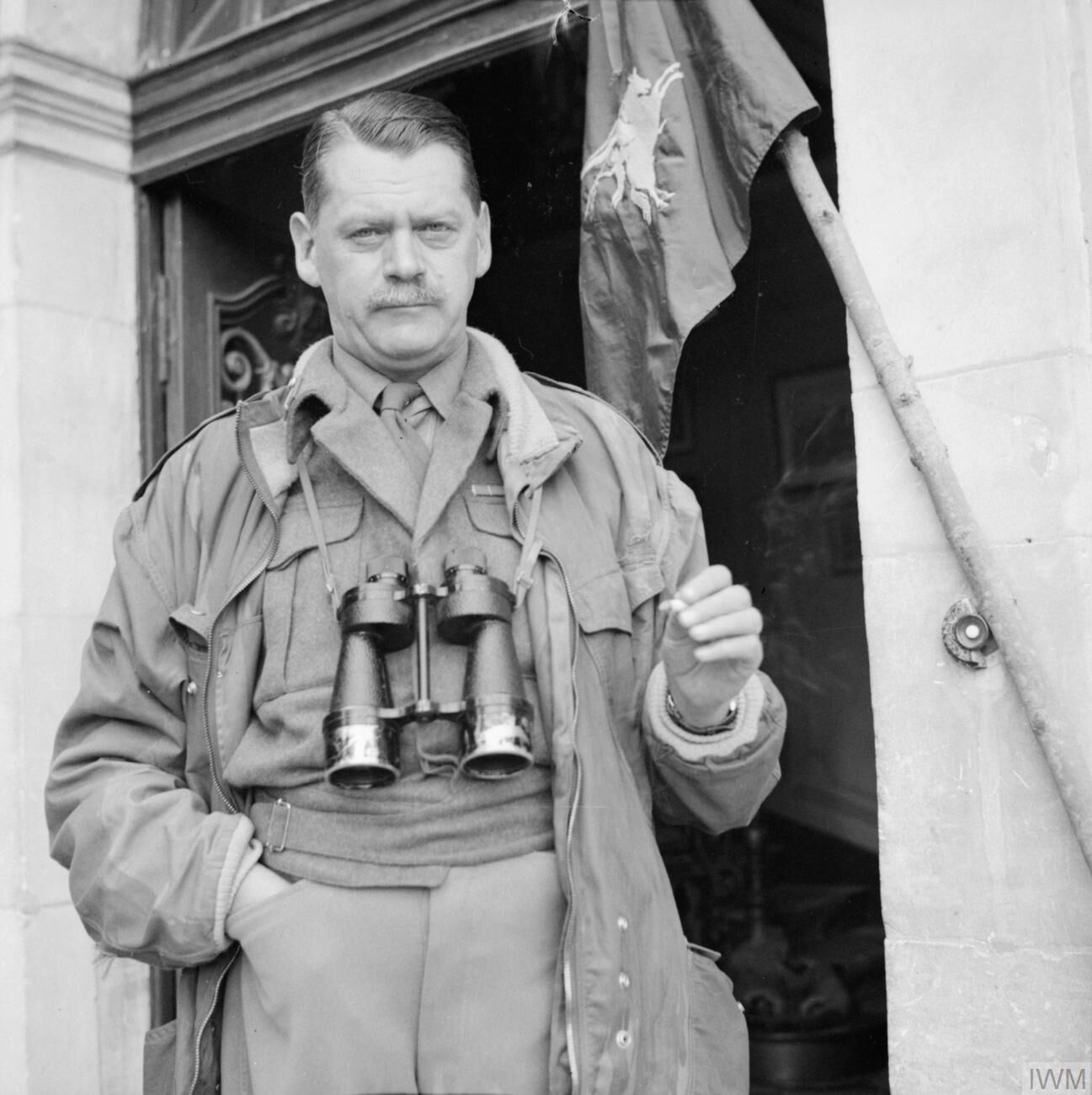
- Gale in 1944
- Born: 25 June 1896; Wandsworth, London, England
- Died: 29 July 1982 (aged 86); Kingston upon Thames, London, England
- Military career
- Allegiance: United Kingdom
- Branch: British Army
- Service years: 1915–1960
- Rank: General
- Nickname: "Windy"
- Service number: 20116
- Units: Worcestershire Regiment; Machine Gun Corps; Duke of Cornwall's Light Infantry; Royal Inniskilling Fusiliers
- Commands: Deputy Supreme Allied Commander, Europe (1958–1960); British Army of the Rhine (1952–1957); British Troops in Egypt (1948–1949); 1st Infantry Division (1946–1947); I Airborne Corps (1945); 6th Airborne Division (1943–1945); 1st Parachute Brigade (1941–1942); 2/5th Battalion, Leicestershire Regiment (1940–1941)
- Conflicts: First World War; Second World War; Palestine Emergency
- Awards: Knight Grand Cross of the Order of the Bath; Knight Commander of the Order of the British Empire; Companion of the Distinguished Service Order; Military Cross; Mentioned in Despatches (2); Commander of the Legion of Merit (United States); Commander of the Legion of Honour (France); Croix de Guerre (France); Grand Officer of the Order of the Crown (Belgium)

General Sir Richard Nelson "Windy" Gale, GCB, KBE, DSO, MC (25 June 1896 – 29 July 1982) was a senior officer in the British Army who served in both world wars. In the First World War he was awarded the Military Cross in 1918 whilst serving as a junior officer in the Machine Gun Corps. During the Second World War he served with 1st Parachute Brigade and then the 6th Airborne Division during the D-Day landings and Operation Tonga in 1944. After the end of the conflict, Gale remained in the army and eventually, in 1958, succeeded Field Marshal The Viscount Montgomery as Deputy Supreme Allied Commander Europe.

== Early life ==
Gale at 14 months old in London, September 1897

Gale was born on 25 June 1896 in London, England, to Wilfred Gale, a merchant from Hull, and his wife Helen Webber Ann, daughter of Joseph Nelson, of Townsville, Queensland, Australia. The early years of his life were spent in Australia and New Zealand due to his father's gaining employment in insurance, but the Gale family returned to England in 1906. He was educated at Merchant Taylors' School, Northwood, a foundation school in the City of London, gaining an average academic record but becoming a prolific reader. After this, he attended further education at Aldenham School in Hertfordshire. For a time, he was a boarder at King Edward VI School, Stratford-upon-Avon.

When Gale left Aldenham he wanted to become a British Army officer in the Royal Artillery, but did not possess the academic qualifications or physical grades required for entry into the Royal Military Academy, Woolwich. Instead Gale followed in his father's footsteps and gained employment as an insurance agent, but he rapidly grew to dislike the job; determined to enter the British Army, he attended regular physical training classes and studied hard to improve his academic grades.

== First World War ==
When the First World War broke out in August 1914, Gale, only recently turned 18, was still below the medical standards required for a recruit and failed to join a Territorial Force unit in London. He finally gained entry to the Royal Military College, Sandhurst in the summer of 1915 and was commissioned into the Worcestershire Regiment, "the regiment of my choice", as a second lieutenant on 22 December. When Gale joined the regiment, he put his name forward for a course on training with machine guns and was accepted, being transferred to the Machine Gun Training Centre at Grantham, Lincolnshire.

However, when I arrived I found I had been sent not on a course but to a corps. I asked to be returned to my unit, but was very properly told to shut up and get on with it. In this way began my secondment to the famous Machine Gun Corps with which I served until its final disbandment in 1922.

Appointed to the MGC on 13 March 1916, in short order he was posted to the Western Front.

Gale was posted, in the summer of 1916, to the 164th Machine Gun Company, which was in support of the 164th (North Lancashire) Brigade of the 55th (West Lancashire) Division, a first-line formation of the Territorial Force (TF). With his company, he fought in the Battle of the Somme and, towards the end of the year, served in the Ypres Salient. He was promoted to the temporary rank of lieutenant on 1 November 1916, and to the substantive rank on 1 July 1917. He was next involved in the Capture of Wytschaete in June 1917 but was not involved in the Passchendaele offensive, as he was suffering from both mental and physical exhaustion, and was sent to England on leave, and diagnosed with pyorrhoea. He returned to service in January 1918, although now serving with the 126th Machine Gun Company of the 126th (East Lancashire) Brigade, part of the 42nd (East Lancashire) Division. Among the fellow officers in his new company was Major Edwin Flavell, who was to serve in Gales' later career. On 23 February the company merged into the 42nd Battalion, MGC. It was during his service as a subaltern in France that he won the Military Cross (MC). During the German spring offensive launched by the German Army in mid-March 1918, Gale was awarded his MC for 'conspicuous gallantry and devotion to duty'. The citation for the MC reads:

For conspicuous gallantry and devotion to duty in covering the retirement of the infantry with his section of machine guns, holding up the attack and causing the enemy heavy casualties. Later, when a shell landed in the centre of the gun limbers, he went out under heavy fire and unhitched the killed and wounded horses, so enabling the transport to move away to cover.

Soon promoted to captain, Gale continued to serve on the Western Front, taking part in the Hundred Days Offensive, until the end of the war on 11 November 1918.

== Between the wars ==
When the war ended in November 1918, Gale volunteered to go to India in 1919, serving with the 12th Battalion, MGC where Captain John Harding was a fellow subaltern who, like Gale, was to attain the highest ranks in the army. However, in 1922 the MGC was disbanded and Gale reverted to serving with the Worcestershire Regiment, and served with the 3rd Battalion, Worcesters before that, too, was disbanded, with Gale transferring to the Machine Gun School in India. In 1924, he married Ethel Maude Larnack Keene. In 1928 he joined the 1st Battalion, Worcesters. During his time in India he gained entry to the Staff College at Quetta, attending from 1930 to 1931, and after two years in the institution he graduated as a staff officer. Promotion prospects during the interwar years were limited, and although he received above average grades in his annual reports, he remained a subaltern for fifteen years, until he was promoted to the rank of captain in the Duke of Cornwall's Light Infantry (DCLI) on 26 February 1930.

In February 1932, Gale was seconded for service as a General Staff Officer Grade 3 (GSO3) in India. He was appointed a brigade major on 1 January 1934. Gale left India in January 1936 and returned to England to serve with the DCLI, receiving a brevet promotion to major on 1 July. In February 1937 he was transferred to the War Office as a GSO2, with responsibilities for the creation of training pamphlets and publications. He transferred to the Royal Inniskilling Fusiliers on 13 October. In December 1938 he was promoted to major and moved to the Staff Duties (Planning) section of the General Staff at the War Office.

== Second World War ==
=== 1939−1942 ===
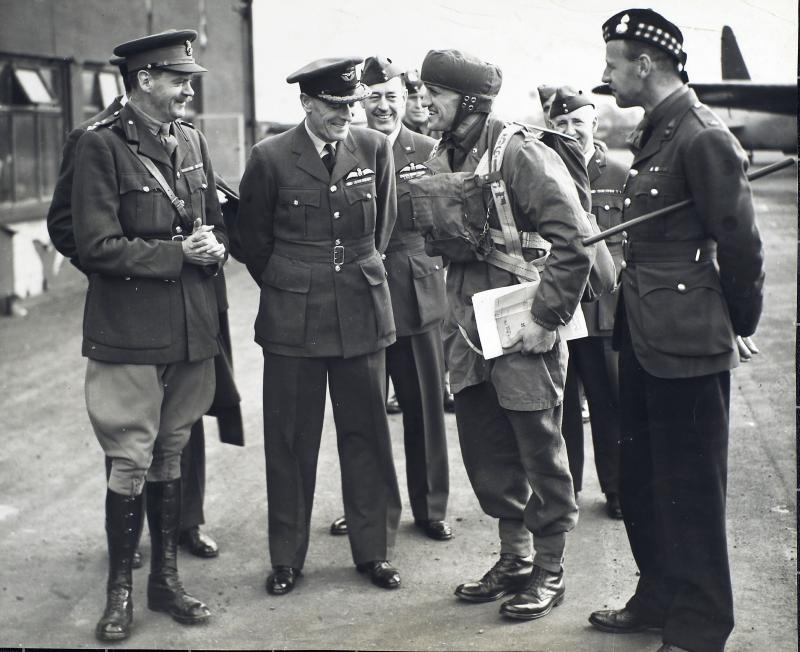
Brigadier Gale (left) in conversation with Lieutenant Colonel Ernest Down (third from right), CO of the 1st Parachute Battalion, during an inspection of Down's battalion at RAF Ringway, 1941.

By December 1940 Gale, who had not seen service with the British Expeditionary Force (BEF) in France and Belgium, had been promoted to the acting rank of lieutenant-colonel and, wishing for a field command, was given command of the 2/5th Battalion, Leicestershire Regiment, a second-line Territorial Army (TA) unit that was part of Brigadier Gerard Bucknall's 138th Infantry Brigade, itself part of the 46th Infantry Division, then commanded by Major-General Charles Hudson, which had fought with the BEF. The battalion, along with the rest of the division, was serving in Scotland, reforming after having sustained very severe casualties in France, before moving to East Anglia in January 1941. Then, in the summer of 1941, the 1st Parachute Brigade was formed as part of the expansion of the British Army's newly created airborne forces, and Gale was offered command of the brigade by General Sir Alan Brooke, the Commander-in-Chief, Home Forces (and soon to be Chief of the Imperial General Staff/CIGS), who was impressed with the high morale and standards in Gale's battalion; he accepted the command. In late October the 1st Airlanding Brigade, under Brigadier George Hopkinson, along with the 1st Parachute Brigade, under Gale, were assigned to the newly created 1st Airborne Division, whose first General Officer Commanding (GOC) was Major-General Frederick "Boy" Browning.

February 1942 saw Operation Biting, perhaps better known as the Bruneval Raid, take place, in which Major John Frost's 'C' Company of the 2nd Parachute Battalion, of Gales' 1st Para Brigade, was selected to participate. The raid, "a model of a combined operation on a minor scale", in Gale's own words was very successful, with the objective – to seize equipment from a German radar station in France – being achieved, although there were casualties. Frost would later command the battalion, most notably in the Battle of Arnhem as part of Operation Market Garden in September 1944.

The next few months were spent organizing the brigade, choosing officers and devising new training schemes. He later described the methods he used in his brigade:

The parachute soldier has characteristics that mark him out among men. First, he is a volunteer and, second, he has to overcome something every time he jumps. Few men will willingly hurl themselves out of an aeroplane, and when doing so they inevitably have to fight fear. Perhaps some may get callous to this, but I think that for the majority it always holds true. When a parachute soldier lands he knows that his future chances of survival rest on his personal skill. His weapon and the comparatively small amount of ammunition he can carry are all he has. He is, for some time at least, away from artillery or tank support; he may be dropped wide and find himself alone and he may be injured; but it is his battle and he knows it. When he jumps the parachute soldier gains something that he never loses.

This splendid material deserved the best officers. In forming my brigade I was fortunate in having the privilege of selecting all company commanders, the commanding officers selecting the remainder. There was no shortage of volunteers. I took as my yardstick their potential as leaders. Though leadership springs from a number of qualities, sometimes not discernible until the supreme test, there is one quality I felt to be essential; this was initiative.

Of all the characteristics the airborne soldier would expect and look for in his officers initiative is probably the most important. I tried this test by putting it in the form of a question of what an individual would do in certain circumstances, and this I tried out later when training my division. Suppose a subaltern had just landed and hears the approach of what he thinks is an enemy tank, what would he do? The answer so often was that he would get on the blower and tell his company commander; to the question what would he have done had he been a company commander in similar circumstances came a similar answer. This tendency to hang decisions on the next superior should have no place in the mental attitude of an airborne officer, for in nine cases out of ten he might never make the contact; but, even if he did, it was action that was wanted and this was where initiative came in.

Then in April 1942 Gale, by now a war-substantive lieutenant-colonel, was ordered to hand over his brigade to Edwin Flavell, formerly his company commander in France over twenty years before, and, much to his displeasure, posted back to the War Office as Deputy Director of Staff Duties (DDSD), and subsequently promoted to Director of Air. Gale's remit as Director of Air was to attempt to formulate a clear policy about the use of airborne forces between the army and the Royal Air Force (RAF), as well as to solve the aircraft shortages that stymied many attempts to conduct further airborne operations. There was a great deal of rivalry between the two services, with the RAF sure that large-scale bombing would win the conflict, and therefore unwilling to transfer any aircraft to the army for use by airborne forces.

=== 1943−1944 ===
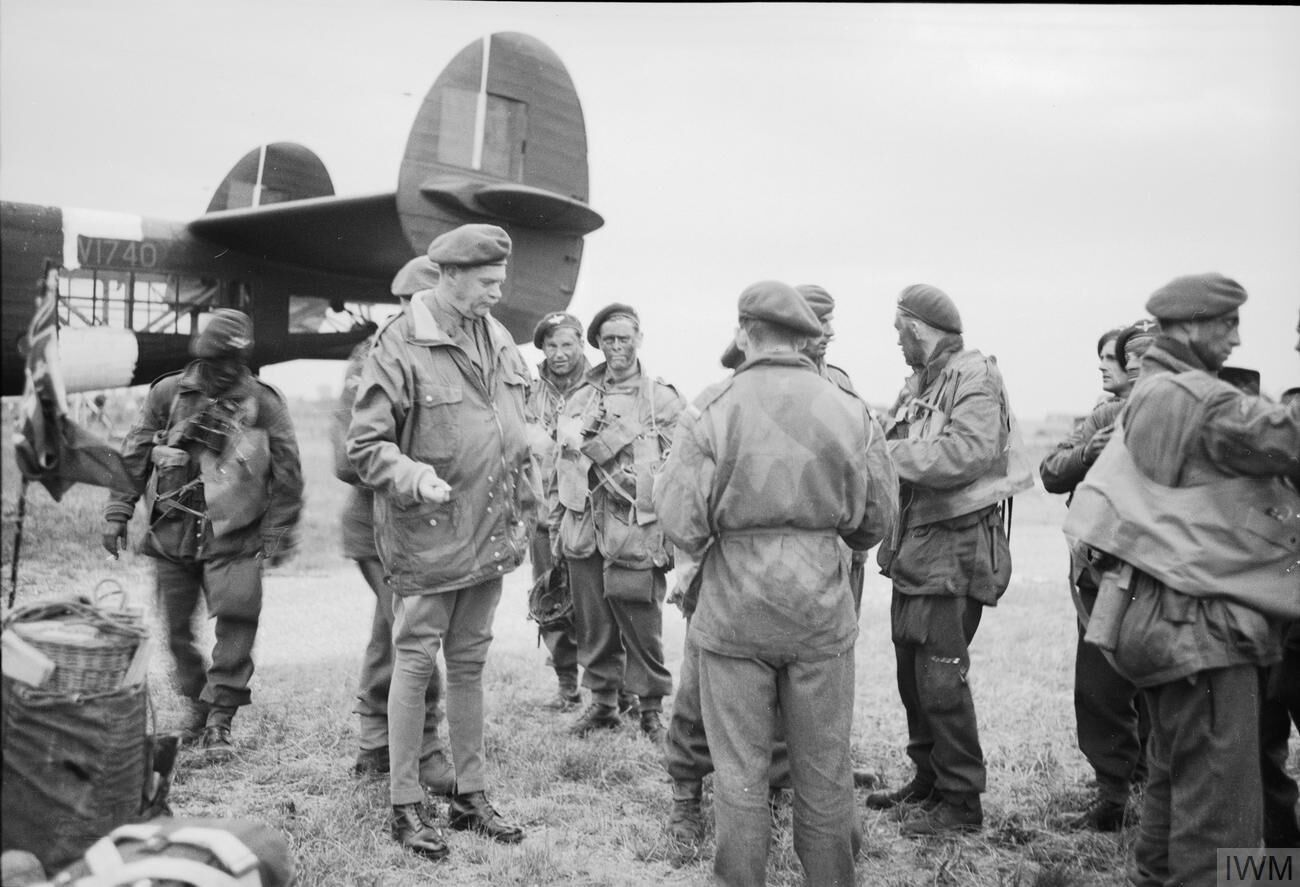
Major-General Richard Gale talking to troops of the 5th Parachute Brigade, in front of an Armstrong Whitworth Albemarle, June 1944.

In May 1943, Gale was promoted to the acting rank of major-general and became GOC of the newly formed 6th Airborne Division. Gale had just under a year to organize and train the division before it was due to participate in Operation Tonga, codename for the British airborne landings in Normandy, in June 1944. The division was initially understrength due to trained British airborne troops being transferred to North Africa and Sicily to replace the very heavy losses suffered by the 1st Airborne Division (now commanded by Hopkinson who had succeeded Browning) during its operations, but it was soon expanded with the arrival of the 1st Canadian Parachute Battalion, joining the 3rd Parachute Brigade, under Brigadier James Hill, as well as the formation of the 5th Parachute Brigade, under Brigadier Nigel Poett, and the 6th Airlanding Brigade, under Brigadier Hugh Kindersley. No British airborne division had ever been deployed into battle entirely through aerial means, and devising plans and formulating tactics for the operation placed a great deal of pressure on Gale.

However, Gale's thoroughness paid off when the division successfully landed in Normandy in June 1944. For his part in planning and taking part in Operation Tonga, Gale was appointed a Companion of the Distinguished Service Order (DSO) on 29 August 1944; in May, he had been promoted to colonel (war-substantive), and also to the temporary rank of major-general. The plan for the Allied invasion of Normandy was for five Allied divisions (two US, two British and one Canadian) to land on designated beaches between Varreville in the west, on the Cotentin Peninsula, and Ouistreham, by the mouth of the river Orne, in the east. Airborne troops were to secure each flank of the beachhead, with the US 82nd and 101st Airborne Divisions landing on the western flank, and the British 6th Airborne Division, under Gale, on the eastern flank. The 6th Airborne Division was to capture a number of bridges over the river Orne and the Caen Canal and hold the nearby surrounding areas, to destroy the bridges over the river Dives, and, finally, to destroy the Merville Gun Battery by the coast.

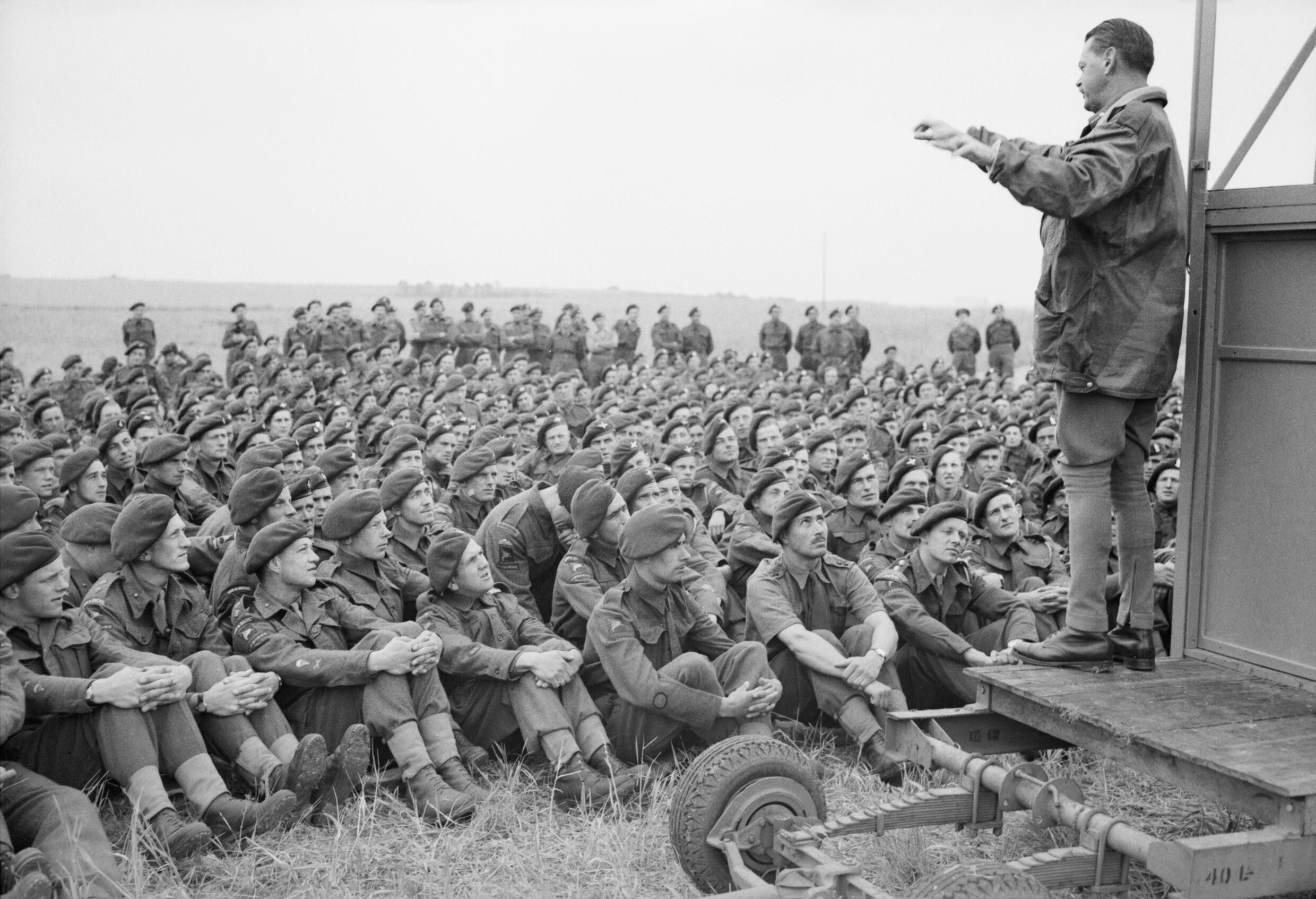
Major-General Richard Gale, GOC 6th Airborne Division, addresses his men, 4 June 1944.

Shortly after midnight on 6 June 1944, known otherwise as D-Day, men of Major John Howard's 'D' Company of the 2nd Battalion, Oxfordshire and Buckinghamshire Light Infantry (2 OBLI), a glider infantry unit forming part of the 6th Airlanding Brigade, landed in glider and captured the Caen canal and Orne river bridges (now known as Pegasus Bridge and Horsa Bridge) via coup de main. It was achieved with light casualties. The two parachute brigades, the 3rd and 5th, landed soon after and landed, for the most part, where intended, although numbers of paratroopers dropped in the flooded countryside. The Merville Gun Battery also fell, although with heavy losses to Lieutenant-Colonel Jock Pearson's 8th Parachute Battalion. At dawn, Gale himself landed in Normandy by a glider piloted by Billy Griffith. By midday on D-Day elements of Brigadier Lord Lovat's 1st Special Service Brigade had landed at Sword Beach, with the British 3rd Infantry Division following, and began to relieve the airborne troops at the bridges. The arrival of the rest of the 6th Airlanding Brigade in the evening, in Operation Mallard, completed the 6th Airborne Division's concentration in Normandy.

The next week saw the 6th Airborne Division, serving as part of Lieutenant-General John Crocker's I Corps, engaged in almost constant fighting, notably at Bréville, in an attempt to prevent the Germans from driving the Allies back into the sea. After mid-June, when German counterattacks ceased, the division, reinforced by the 1st and 4th Special Service Brigades, spent the next two months in a static defence role, holding a nine thousand yard front southwards from the sea.

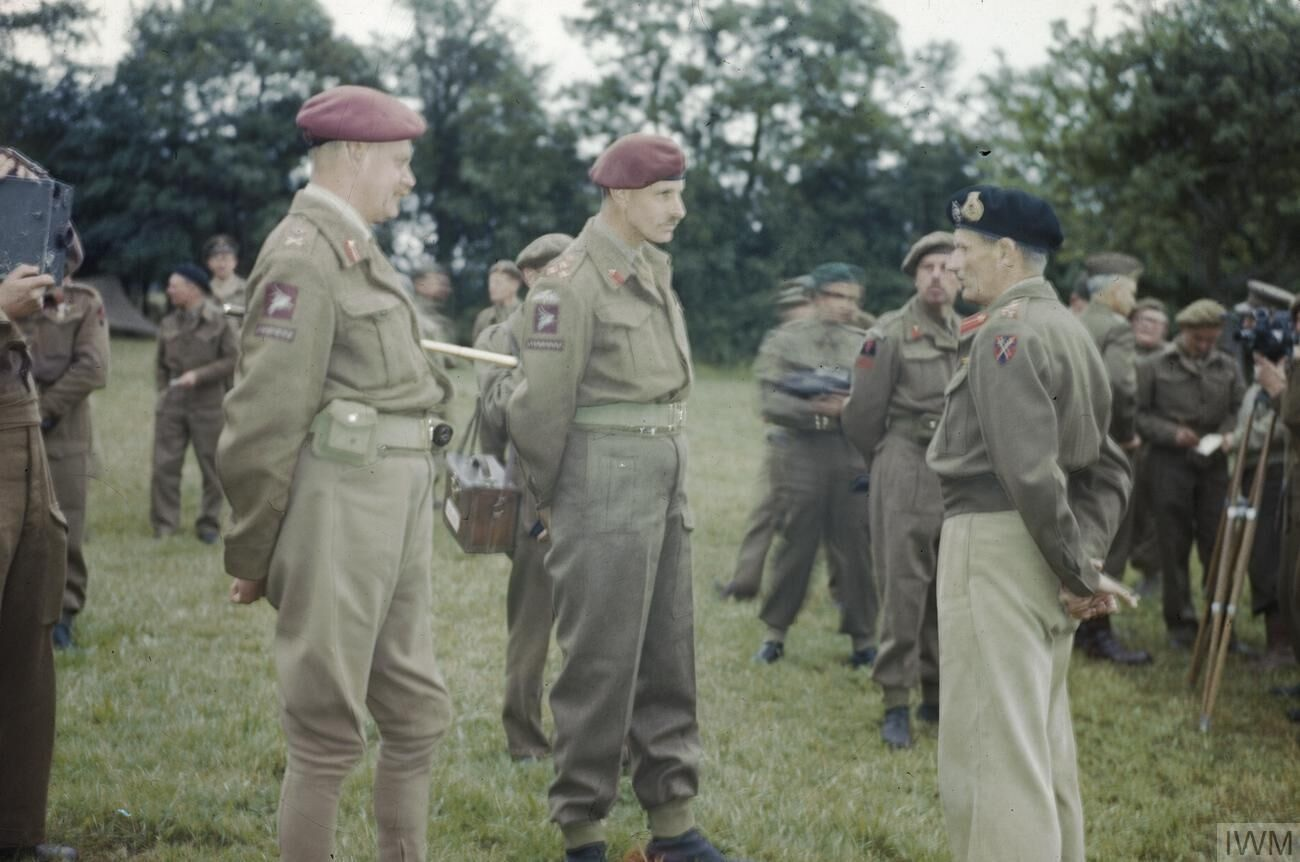
General Bernard Montgomery (right) talking to Major-General Richard Gale and Brigadier Nigel Poett. Both men had just been decorated by Lieutenant General Omar Bradley, commanding the U.S. First Army, on behalf of President Franklin D. Roosevelt at General Montgomery's HQ in Normandy, 13 July 1944.

In mid-August, with the situation in Normandy turning against the Germans and forcing them to withdraw to Falaise, the division was ordered to go over to the offensive and pursued to the Germans to the Seine, advancing some 45 miles in nine days, capturing 400 square miles of enemy territory and capturing over 1,000 of the enemy. All this was achieved despite the belief of Crocker, the corps commander, and Gale himself, that the division was poorly equipped for a rapid pursuit.

=== 1944−1945 ===
On 5 September the division was taken out of the front lines, after almost exactly three months since landing in Normandy, and returned to the United Kingdom for rest and recuperation, after sustaining almost 4,500 casualties. Soon after returning to England the 6th Airborne Division's sister formation, the 1st Airborne Division, then under Major-General Roy Urquhart, took part in the hugely ambitious Operation Market Garden, which Gale believed was doomed to failure from the start.

In December Gale handed over command of the division to Major-General Eric Bols, formerly an infantry brigade commander, who was soon to lead the division in a ground role in the Battle of the Bulge. Gale was then appointed to the headquarters of the First Allied Airborne Army (FAAAA), becoming deputy to the American commander, Lieutenant General Lewis H. Brereton. Planning then began for Operation Varsity, the airborne landings in support of Operation Plunder, the Allied crossing of the river Rhine. The operation was carried out in late March 1945 by the US XVIII Airborne Corps, under Major General Matthew Ridgway, with the British 6th and US 17th Airborne Divisions participating. Despite the operation's success, with Gale calling it "the most successful of all airborne operations", both divisions suffered very heavy casualties and the need for the entire operation was questioned, both at the time and later.

In the last months of the war in Europe, Gale was given command of I Airborne Corps. He was promoted to the permanent rank of major-general on 7 January 1945, with the acting rank of lieutenant-general from 24 May. In July, after Victory in Europe Day (VE-Day), Gale, with the corps HQ, was sent to India, where the Japanese were still fighting. In India Gale took elements of his old 6th Airborne Division, still led by Bols, under command, along with the 44th Indian Airborne Division, and planning began for airborne operations in the Far East, in particular the recapturing of Bangkok, although the surrender of Japan cancelled these plans and, after almost six years, the war finally came to an end.

== Later life ==
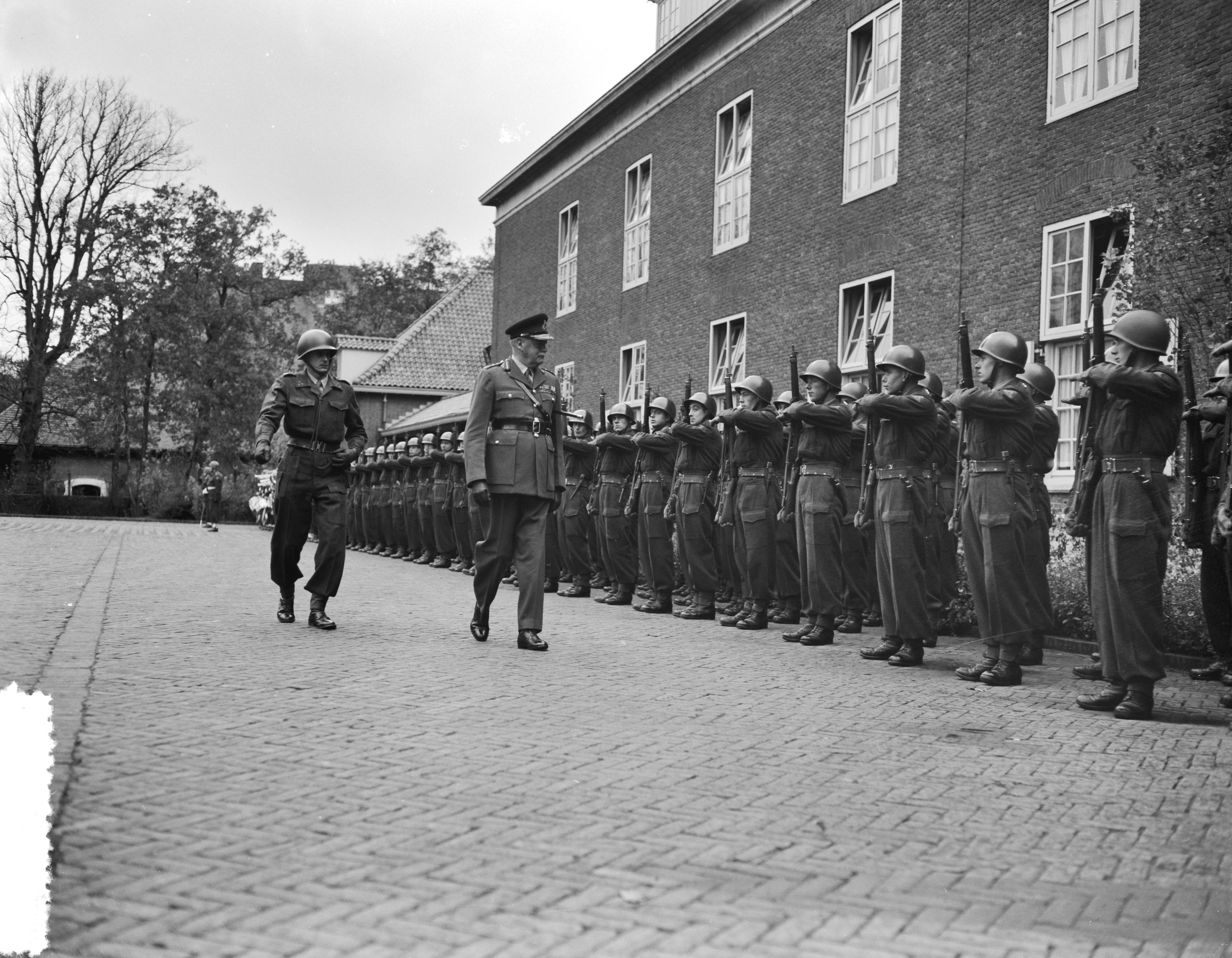
General Sir Richard Gale inspecting a RNLAF Honor Guard, 29 October 1956.

On 4 December 1946, Gale was promoted to the substantive rank of lieutenant-general. In January 1946, shortly after I Airborne Corps was disbanded, Gale became GOC of the 1st Infantry Division, succeeding Major-General Charles Loewen, then stationed in Egypt before, in March, being sent to Palestine, where there were tensions between the Jews and the Arabs, and commanded the division throughout the Palestine Emergency. Gales' division, serving under British Forces in Palestine and Trans-Jordan, commanded by Lieutenant-General Sir Evelyn Barker (later replaced by Lieutenant-General Sir Gordon MacMillan), was responsible for northern Palestine, with his old 6th Airborne Division, now commanded by Major-General James Cassels, responsible for southern Palestine. Gale relinquished command of the division to Major-General Horatius Murray in December 1947 and, in January 1948, he was appointed GOC British Troops in Egypt, succeeding Lieutenant-General Sir Charles Allfrey. Then in 1949, after handing over the command to Lieutenant-General George Erskine, he was transferred and became Director-General of Military Training. Gale was promoted to general on 6 June 1952, eight years after he landed in Normandy, and appointed Commander-in-Chief (C-in-C), Northern Army Group, Allied Land Forces Europe and British Army of the Rhine (BAOR), succeeding General Sir John Harding, on 24 September; he held the post until retiring in 1957, in turn handing over BAOR to General Sir Dudley Ward. His wife Ethel having died in 1952, on 7 April 1953, Gale married secondly Daphne Mabelle Eveline, daughter of Francis Blick, of Stroud, Gloucestershire.

Gale initially retired in 1957, but in September 1958 he was recalled to serve with NATO and replaced Field Marshal Sir Bernard Montgomery as Deputy Supreme Allied Commander, Europe; he retired permanently in September 1960 after two years in the post and was replaced by General Sir Hugh Stockwell. During the post-war years, Gale also held a number of ceremonial and non-military posts; he was aide-de-camp (general) to the Queen Elizabeth II between 1954 and 1957, Colonel of the Worcestershire Regiment between 1950 and 1961, and Colonel-Commandant of the Parachute Regiment between 1956 and 1967.

Gale died at his home in Kingston upon Thames on 29 July 1982, just four days after his 86th birthday. His widow, Daphne, subsequently lived in a grace and favour apartment in Hampton Court Palace; she died during a major fire at the palace in March 1986, caused by the lighted candle she used in her bedroom at night whilst having a drink, as was her habit. The fire necessitated an extensive restoration programme which was completed in 1990.

== Military thinking ==
Gale's approach to military affairs emerged from both his personal history and personality. Gale, a 'tall, bluff, ruddy' individual, with a reputation as 'a bit of a buccaneer' but allegedly possessing a 'hectoring manner and a loud voice', was one of a number of First World War veterans to challenge the military status quo that had led to the terrible losses on the Western Front. Events such as the losses in the Battle of the Somme in 1916 heavily influenced Gale's thinking, and he emerged from the war with a suspicion of predominantly firepower-led operations. Looking back, Gale was to remember the 'wonderful panorama' of the infantry successfully advancing using modern infiltration tactics on a clear day in the spring of 1918, contributing to his embracing the interwar manoeuvrist theorists during his time at the Staff College, Quetta in the early 1930s. Gale saw a narrative in the sequence of developments from the creation of the new infantry tactics of 1918, through to the tanks and airborne forces of the 1940s, that demonstrated the 'fundamental necessity of mobility on the battlefield', and the importance of surprise at all levels of warfare.

During the Second World War, Gale applied these principles to the development of airborne forces. An advocate of shock manoeuvre with elite forces, Gale stressed extensive training, the use of the latest battlefield technologies and strong personal leadership. For Gale, the quality of one's military forces were as important as their number, and he drew additional lessons on the disproportionate effect that surprise manoeuvre had on a "demoralised or unprepared enemy", as opposed to a 'well-trained opposition', from the operations of his own 6th Airborne Division in Normandy. Later in life, Gale examined the issues of war in the nuclear age. Still an advocate of manoeuvre and high-quality forces, Gale was to stress the importance of achieving mobility and flexibility in the face of the Soviet threat, foreshadowing in many ways the evolution of the AirLand battle doctrine of the 1980s.

== Honours and awards ==
- Knight Grand Cross of the Order of the Bath – 1954 (KCB – 1953; CB – 2 August 1945)
- Knight Commander of the Order of the British Empire – 1950 (OBE – 11 July 1940)
- Companion of the Distinguished Service Order – 31 August 1944
- Military Cross – 1918
- Mentioned in Despatches – 22 March 1945, 7 January 1949
- Commander of the Legion of Merit (USA) – 16 January 1948 (Officer – 20 June 1944)
- Commandeur de la Légion d'honneur (France) – 28 December 1956
- Croix de Guerre with Palm (France) – 28 December 1956
- Grand Officier de la Couronne (Belgium)

== Publications ==
- With the 6th Airborne Div in Normandy (Sampson Low, Marston & Co, London, 1948)
- Infantry in Modern Battle: Its Organization and Training (Canadian Army Journal 8, no. 1, 1955: 52–61)
- Generalship and the art of Command in this Nuclear Age (RUSI Journal 101, no. 603, 1956: 376–384)
- Call to arms. An autobiography (Hutchinson, London, 1968)
- Great battles of biblical history (Hutchinson, London, 1968)
- The Worcestershire Regiment, the 29th and 36th Regiments of foot (Leo Cooper, London, 1970)
- Kings at arms: The Use and Abuse of power in the Great Kingdoms of the East (Hutchinson, London, 1971)

== Bibliography ==
- Crookenden, Napier (1976). DropZone Normandy: the story of the American and British airborne assault on D Day 1944. London (UK): Ian Allan. OCLC 249433658.
- Dover, Major Victor (1981). The Sky Generals. Cassell. ISBN 0-304-30480-8.
- Farrar-Hockley, Anthony; revised (2004). "Gale, Sir Richard Nelson (1896–1982)". Oxford Dictionary of National Biography (online ed.). Oxford University Press. doi:10.1093/ref:odnb/31134. (Subscription, Wikipedia Library access or UK public library membership required.)
- Gale, Richard (1948). With the 6th Airborne Division in Normandy. London (UK): Sampson Low. OCLC 4447265.
- Gale, Richard (1955). "Infantry in Modern Battle: Its Organization and Training". Canadian Army Journal. 8 (1): 52–61.
- Gale, Richard (1956). "Generalship and the art of Command in this Nuclear Age". RUSI Journal. 101 (603): 376–384.
- Gale, Richard (1968). Call to arms: an autobiography. London (UK): Hutchinson. ISBN 0-09-086430-1.
- Lovat, Lord (1978). March Past : A Memoir. London (UK): Weidenfeld & Nicolson. ISBN 0-297-77456-5.
- Mead, Richard (2007). Churchill's Lions: A biographical guide to the key British generals of World War II. Stroud (UK): Spellmount. ISBN 978-1-86227-431-0.
- Smart, Nick (2005). Biographical Dictionary of British Generals of the Second World War. Barnesley: Pen & Sword. ISBN 1844150496.

Military offices
New command	GOC 6th Airborne Division; 1943–1944	Succeeded by Eric Bols
Preceded by Frederick Browning	GOC I Airborne Corps; 1944–1945	Post disbanded
Preceded by Charles Loewen	GOC 1st Infantry Division; 1946–1947	Succeeded by Horatius Murray
Preceded by Sir Charles Allfrey	GOC British Troops in Egypt; 1948–1949	Succeeded by Sir George Erskine
Honorary titles
Preceded by Bowcher Clarke	Colonel of the Worcestershire Regiment; 1950–1961	Succeeded by Donald Nott
Military offices
Preceded by Sir John Harding	C-in-C British Army of the Rhine; 1952–1957	Succeeded by Sir Dudley Ward
Preceded by The Viscount Montgomery of Alamein	Deputy Supreme Allied Commander, Europe; 1958–1960	Succeeded by Sir Hugh Stockwell
