= Frederick Browning (cricketer) =

English cricketer and British Army officer

Personal information
- Full name: Frederick Henry Browning
- Born: 1 August 1870; Bury St Edmunds, Suffolk, England
- Died: 13 October 1929 (aged 59); Flaxley, Gloucestershire, England
- Batting: Right-handed

Domestic team information
- Years: Team
- 1907–1908: Marylebone Cricket Club

Career statistics
Competition	First-class
Matches	3
Runs scored	38
Batting average	9.50
100s/50s	–/–
Top score	27
Catches/stumpings	–/–
- Source: Cricinfo, 8 May 2021

Frederick Henry Browning CBE (1 August 1870 – 13 October 1929) was an English first-class cricketer, rackets player and British Army officer.

The son of Montague Charles Browning, he was born at Bury St Edmunds in August 1870. He was educated at Wellington College, where he played with some success for the college cricket eleven. He also played for the rugby team and excelled in rackets, playing in the college first pair for three years. From Wellington he went up to Magdalen College, Oxford. There he continued to excel in rackets and played cricket for Magdalen College, though he did not play for Oxford University Cricket Club. He left Oxford without completing his degree, choosing instead to become a wine merchant, shortly thereafter joining the family firm Twiss & Brownings, whose main import was Hennessy. He became a senior partner in 1905 and formed a close friendship with the Hennessy family. He continued to play rackets at amateur level and was considered the best amateur player of his generation, winning the Amateur Doubles Championship in 1893 with Harry Foster and in 1895 with Francis Dames-Longworth. Browning was a member of the Marylebone Cricket Club (MCC), the Free Foresters and I Zingari, serving on the committee of the latter two. He toured North America with the MCC in September 1907, playing two first-class matches against the Gentlemen of Philadelphia, before making a third first-class appearance against the Gentlemen of Philadelphia during their visit to Lord's in August 1908. His three first-class matches yielded him 38 runs with a highest score of 27. He toured Egypt with I Zingari in 1914, captaining the side.

Browning served in the British Army during the First World War, predominantly on the staff. He was an aide-de-camp and temporary captain while serving with the Argyll and Sutherland Highlanders in October 1914. In April 1915 he was appointed to the staff at the War Office in London. Browning was twice decorated by Allied nations during the course of the war. He was decorated by the Russian Empire with the Order of Saint Anna, 3rd Class in June 1917, at which point he held the temporary rank of lieutenant colonel. In September 1917, he was decorated by Belgium with the Order of the Crown. Following the war, he was made a commander of the Order of the British Empire in the 1919 New Year Honours and was later decorated by Italy with Order of the Crown of Italy in April 1919. Browning married Anne Alt in March 1894, with the couple having two children: a son and a daughter.

Their son, Frederick, became a lieutenant-general in the British Army and became known as the "father of the British airborne forces" during the Second World War. Browning died in October 1929 at Flaxley, Gloucestershire. His brother was the Admiral Sir Montague Browning.
