= I Airborne Corps (United Kingdom) =

- Active: 1943–1945
- Country: United Kingdom
- Branch: British Army
- Type: Infantry
- Role: Airborne forces
- Size: Corps
- Part of: First Allied Airborne Army
- Nickname: Red Devils (Note: The 1st Parachute Brigade had been called the "Rote Teufel" or "Red Devils" by the German troops they had fought in North Africa. The title was officially confirmed by General Sir Harold Alexander and henceforth applied to all British airborne troops.)

Commanders
- Notable commanders: Sir Frederick Browning; Sir Richard Gale

The I Airborne Corps was an airborne forces corps raised by the British Army during the Second World War. Together with the U.S. XVIII Airborne Corps it was part of the First Allied Airborne Army.

== Formation ==
Under the command of Lieutenant-General Frederick Arthur Montague Browning, I Airborne Corps was formed in 1943, with the 1st and 6th Airborne Divisions under command. The Corps also contained the Special Air Service's SAS Brigade. In August 1944, the corps became part of the First Allied Airborne Army, alongside U.S. XVIII Airborne Corps.

Later in the war, as well as the 1st and 6th Airborne Divisions, the corps had the 1st Special Service Brigade, the Polish 1st Parachute Brigade and the 52nd (Lowland) Infantry Division an air-transportable division under corps command. Other units assigned to the corps were the American 82nd, and 101st Airborne Divisions during Operation Market Garden in September 1944. Lieutenant-General Richard Nelson Gale, who had previously commanded the 6th Airborne Division during the Battle of Normandy, took command of the corps in December 1944.

== Notes ==
Footnotes

Citations
