= Montague Browning =

Royal Navy Admiral (1863–1947)

Admiral Sir Montague Browning GCB GCMG GCVO
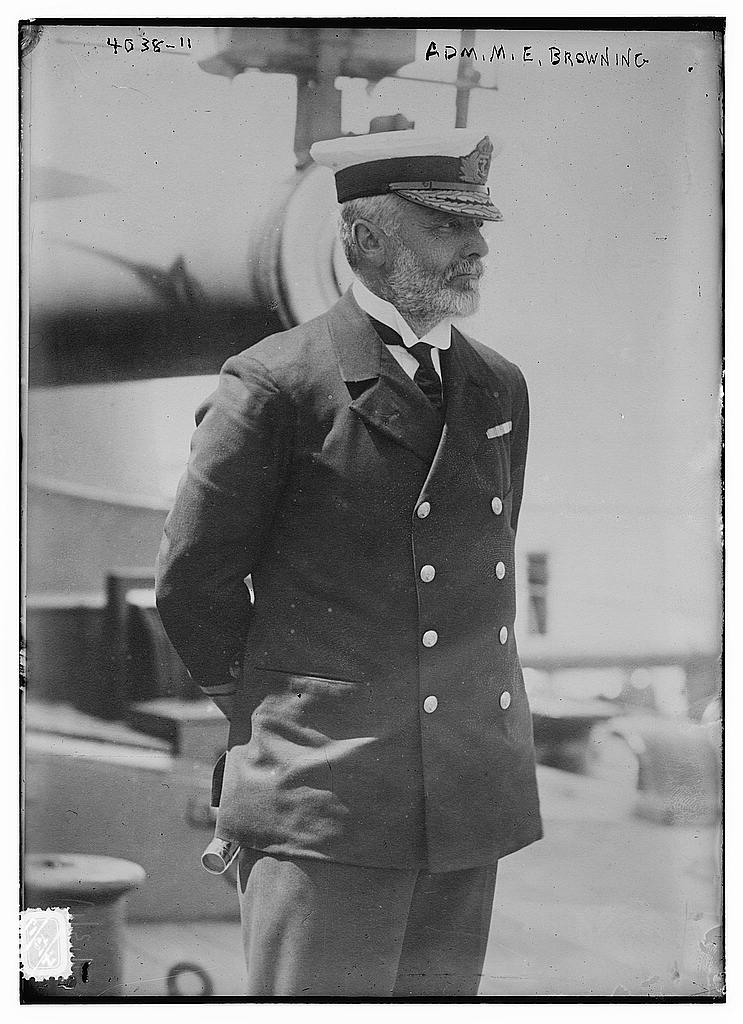
- Browning in 1916
- Born: 18 January 1863; Fornham St Martin, Suffolk, England
- Died: 4 November 1947 (aged 84); Winchester, Hampshire, England
- Relatives: Frederick Browning (nephew)
- Military career
- Allegiance: United Kingdom
- Branch: Royal Navy
- Service years: 1876–1926
- Rank: Admiral
- Commands: Plymouth Command; Second Sea Lord; 4th Battle Squadron; North America and West Indies Station; 3rd Cruiser Squadron; HMS Ariadne
- Conflicts: Anglo-Egyptian War; World War I
- Awards: Knight Grand Cross of the Order of the Bath; Knight Grand Cross of the Order of St Michael and St George; Knight Grand Cross of the Royal Victorian Order; Commander of the Legion of Honour (France); Grand Cordon of the Order of the Sacred Treasure (Japan); Distinguished Service Medal (United States); Grand Cordon of the Order of the Precious Brilliant Golden Grain (China)

Admiral Sir Montague Edward Browning, GCB, GCMG, GCVO (18 January 1863 – 4 November 1947) was a senior Royal Navy officer who served as Second Sea Lord and Chief of Naval Personnel.

== Military career ==
Browning joined the Royal Navy in 1876. He served in the Anglo-Egyptian War and then became Secretary to the Parliamentary Committee on Water Tube Boilers in 1900.

He was promoted to captain on 1 January 1902, and in June that year was appointed flag captain in command of the cruiser HMS Ariadne. She was commissioned on 5 June 1902 as flagship of Vice-Admiral Sir Archibald Douglas, the new Commander-in-Chief of the North America and West Indies Station, where she arrived to take up the position on 15 July. Browning became Chief of Staff for the Channel Fleet in 1908 and Inspector of Target Practice in 1911. He was appointed a Naval aide-de-camp to the King in 1910, and promoted to rear-admiral in 1911.

He served in the World War I as Commander of the 3rd Cruiser Squadron of the Grand Fleet and then, from 1916, as Commander-in-Chief North America and West Indies. He commanded 4th Battle Squadron of the Grand Fleet from 1918.

After the War he became President of the Allied Naval Armistice Commission and had the task of dismantling the German Fleet.

He then became Second Sea Lord and Chief of Naval Personnel in 1919. In this capacity he also sought to dismantle the Royal Canadian Navy but this time faced determined and successful opposition from Rear Admiral Walter Hose. His last appointment was as Commander-in-Chief, Plymouth from 1920. He also became First and Principal Naval Aide-de-Camp to the King in 1925 and retired from the navy on 4 October 1926.

He was also Rear Admiral of the United Kingdom from 1929 to 1939 and then Vice Admiral of the United Kingdom from 1939 to 1945.

He lived at Crawley near Winchester. His brother was Frederick Browning, a cricketer and British Army officer.

== Honours ==
Browning was appointed a Member (4th class) of the Royal Victorian Order in 1908 on the occasion of the Prince of Wales' visit to Quebec. He was appointed a Companion of the Order of the Bath (CB) in the 1916 Birthday Honours in recognition of wartime service, and promoted to Knight Commander of the Order (KCB) in the 1917 Birthday Honours, again in recognition of wartime service. He was appointed a Knight Grand Cross of the Order of St Michael and St George (GCMG) in the 1919 New Year Honours for wartime service.

He was promoted to Knight Grand Cross of the Order of the Bath (GCB) in the 1924 Birthday Honours, and to Knight Grand Cross of the Royal Victorian Order (GCVO) in the 1933 New Year Honours.

Military offices
Preceded by Sir George Patey	Commander-in-Chief, North America and West Indies Station; 1916–1918	Succeeded by Sir William Grant
Preceded by Sir Herbert Heath	Second Sea Lord; 1919–1920	Succeeded by Sir Henry Oliver
Preceded by Sir Cecil Thursby	Commander-in-Chief, Plymouth; 1920–1923	Succeeded by Sir Richard Phillimore
Honorary titles
Preceded by Sir Somerset Gough-Calthorpe	First and Principal Naval Aide-de-Camp; 1925–1926	Succeeded by Sir Arthur Leveson
Preceded by Sir Stanley Colville	Rear-Admiral of the United Kingdom; 1929–1939	Succeeded by Sir Hubert Brand
Preceded by Sir Stanley Colville	Vice-Admiral of the United Kingdom; 1939–1945	Succeeded by Sir Martin Dunbar-Nasmith
