= First Allied Airborne Army =

Commanding unit of all Allied airborne troops in Europe during WW2

- Badge of the First Allied Airborne Army.
- Active: 2 August 1944 – 20 May 1945
- Countries: United States United Kingdom; Dominion of Canada; Polish government-in-exile Free France Kingdom of Belgium
- Type: Airborne forces
- Role: Headquarters
- Part of: Allied Expeditionary Force
- Engagements: World War II: Operation Market Garden; Battle of the Bulge; Operation Varsity

Commanders
- Lieutenant General: Lewis H. Brereton

The First Allied Airborne Army was an Allied formation formed on 2 August 1944 by the order of General Dwight D. Eisenhower, the Supreme Allied Commander of the Allied Expeditionary Force.

The formation was part of the Allied Expeditionary Force and controlled all Allied airborne forces in Western Europe from August 1944 to May 1945. These included the U.S. IX Troop Carrier Command, the U.S. XVIII Airborne Corps, which controlled the 17th, 82nd and 101st Airborne Divisions and a number of independent airborne units, all British airborne forces including the 1st and 6th Airborne Division plus the Polish 1st Parachute Brigade.

From the time of its creation until the end of World War II, the formation commanded the Allied airborne forces that participated in the Allied advance through North-West Europe, including Operation Market Garden in September 1944, repelling the German counter-offensive launched during the Battle of the Bulge between December 1944 and January 1945, and Operation Varsity in March 1945.

After the surrender of Nazi Germany, the formation was deactivated, the constituent units reverting to their national armies on 20 May 1945.

== Formation ==
=== Recommendation for creation ===
General Dwight D. Eisenhower, the Supreme Allied Commander of the Allied Expeditionary Force believed that a unified command was required with authority to coordinate all airborne and troop carrier units, direct airborne operations and command attached army, naval and air force units. The organization would be based on the model of a modified corps headquarters and be commanded by a high-ranking officer of the United States Army Air Forces (USAAF). On 20 May 1944, a sub-section of the Supreme Headquarters Allied Expeditionary Force (SHAEF) recommended that all British and American airborne forces be unified under a single formation; troop carrier units, however, would still remain independent and under the control of the Allied Expeditionary Air Force (AEAF). This recommendation was sent to 12th Army Group, 21st Army Group and the AEAF.

=== Opposition and support ===
The recommendation to create a unified airborne army was criticized and opposed by the Chief of Staff of 12th Army Group, Major General Leven Cooper Allen. Allen argued that the larger number of American airborne troops, the differences in equipment and staff between British and American formations, and the fact that the available transport aircraft only had the capacity to carry the total number of American airborne troops and not British as well, all meant that there was no need for a unified command for both American and British airborne forces.

The Royal Air Force, was an independent organization, unlike the USAAF, and senior British airborne commanders were apprehensive about having an Air Force officer command soldiers, in case the RAF could then use this at a later date as precedent to command British airborne troops. Further objections were raised by officers of the AEAF, regarding the administrative problems of assigning RAF units to the proposed combined headquarters. Air Chief Marshal Trafford Leigh-Mallory, commander-in-chief of the AEAF, argued that the original recommendation should be followed – unifying American and British airborne forces but leaving troop carrier units under the command of the AEAF.

However, the 21st Army Group and the AEAF both agreed to the recommendation, only suggesting a few minor changes to be made, and on 17 June Major General Harold R. Bull, the Assistant Chief-of-Staff, Operations and Plans (G-3) of SHAEF, recommended that a combined airborne troops headquarters be created, albeit one that did not control troop carrier units.

=== Appointment of Brereton and activation of formation ===
Despite the opposition, Eisenhower remained convinced for the need of a single unified command that would control both airborne forces and troop carrier units, and outlined his proposal in messages to General of the Army George Marshall and General of the Air Force Henry H. Arnold asking for the assignment of an USAAF officer as commander of the unified headquarters. Marshall, however, asked for further clarification of the role of the commander, asking whether he would simply function as a corps commander of the airborne divisions or command all air and ground troops, and who would command the airborne forces once they had landed and gone into action. After much discussion the three men agreed that an Air Force commander would control all airborne forces until the situation on the ground permitted normal logistical support for the forces involved, when control would revert to a ground commander.

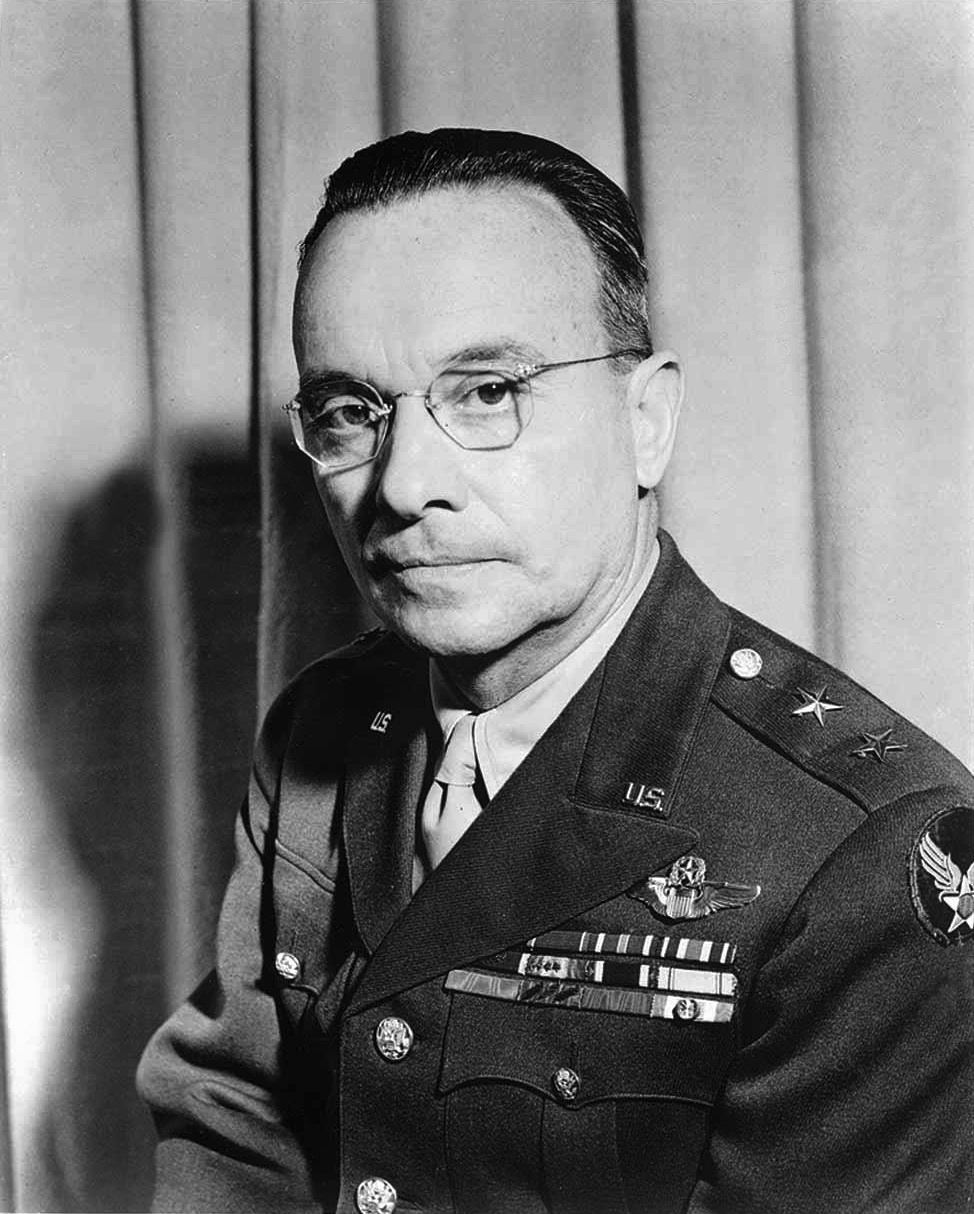
Lieutenant General Lewis Brereton

Having solved the problems of what the commander of the unified headquarters would control, and when, the search then began for qualified personnel who could serve at the headquarters. The United States Department of War indicated that some personnel from the Airborne Center at Camp Mackall would be available for the new headquarters, and that the headquarters of Second Airborne Brigade, would be disbanded and its personnel transferred to the new unit. In addition, the United States Strategic Air Forces in Europe would allocate ten officers and fifty enlisted men.

After discussion between Eisenhower, Arnold and Marshall, it was decided that the first commanding officer of the formation was to be USAAF Lieutenant General Lewis H. Brereton, who was commanding the USAAF Ninth Air Force. Brereton learnt of his appointment on 17 July when in conference with the commanding officer of the USAAF, General Carl Spaatz, and was initially unconvinced of the merits of a combined headquarters, suggesting instead that American airborne forces be placed under the command of the Ninth Air Force, a suggestion which was denied by Eisenhower.

With Brereton having agreed to his appointment, the First Allied Airborne Army was activated on the 2nd of August 1944

=== Name and structure ===
Brereton recommended that the combined headquarters was renamed 'First Allied Airborne Army', which was approved by Eisenhower on 16 August after a brief period of opposition by Major General Bull, who argued that such a name would be inaccurate, as he believed there was no intention of using the organization as an Army. The new organization was assigned operational control over IX Troop Carrier Command, XVIII Corps (Airborne), and British I Airborne Corps and all their subsidiary units. RAF troop carrier units would be assigned as necessary.

As commander of First Allied Airborne Army, Brereton was directly responsible to SHAEF and General Eisenhower. His responsibilities included training and allocation of facilities, development of new airborne equipment, consultation with the commanders-in-chief of the AEAF and the Allied naval forces, and the planning and execution of airborne operations.

== Operations ==
=== Cancelled operations in France ===
During August 1944, American forces under General Omar Bradley launched Operation Cobra, the Allied forces breakout of Normandy to the West after several months grinding down German forces at the eastern end of the lodgement and the capture of the Cherbourg peninsula. The operation had been a success, despite a fierce German counter-attack on 7 August codenamed Operation Lüttich, and a number of German divisions had become trapped near Falaise in what was labelled the Falaise Pocket. Following this, the Allies began to advance rapidly.

Several airborne operations were planned for First Allied Airborne Army in late August and early September to support the rapid advance of Allied ground forces.

- Operation Transfigure was to close the gap between Orléans and Paris in order to block the retreat of German forces. The operation was cancelled before it could begin when Allied forces captured Dreux, the town which had been the planned dropping point for the airborne forces. General Eisenhower's fears that such an airborne operation would create a heavy burden on the limited ground transport available to the Allied forces also contributed to the decision to cancel the operation.
- Operation Axehead was to seize the bridges over the River Seine in support of 21st Army Group.
- Operation Boxer was concerned with the capture of Boulogne using the same forces as Transfigure.
- Operation Linnet was to seize crossings around Tournai and create a bridgehead over the River Escaut, which would cut off a large number of retreating German formations in a similar manner to Transfigure.
- Operation Linnet II was to land forces in the area of Aachen and Maastricht in order to cut off retreating German forces.
- Operation Infatuate was to land forces on Walcheren Island to assist in opening the port of Antwerp by cutting off any German retreat across the Scheldt estuary.
- Operation Comet envisioned using the British 1st Airborne Division, along with the Polish 1st Independent Parachute Brigade, to secure several bridges over the River Rhine to aid the Allied advance into the North German Plain. However several days of poor weather and concerns over increasing levels of German resistance caused the operation to be cancelled on 10 September.

Most of the operations were cancelled due to the rapid movement of Allied ground forces as they advanced through France and Belgium, as it did not allow First Allied Airborne Army enough time to plan an operation and deploy its forces before the objectives were overrun by ground forces. This situation changed, however, by the middle of September, as Allied forces came into contact with the German frontier and the Siegfried Line and encountered considerable German resistance, with German forces beginning to set up organized defensive positions and the Allied advance slowing.

=== Operation Market Garden ===
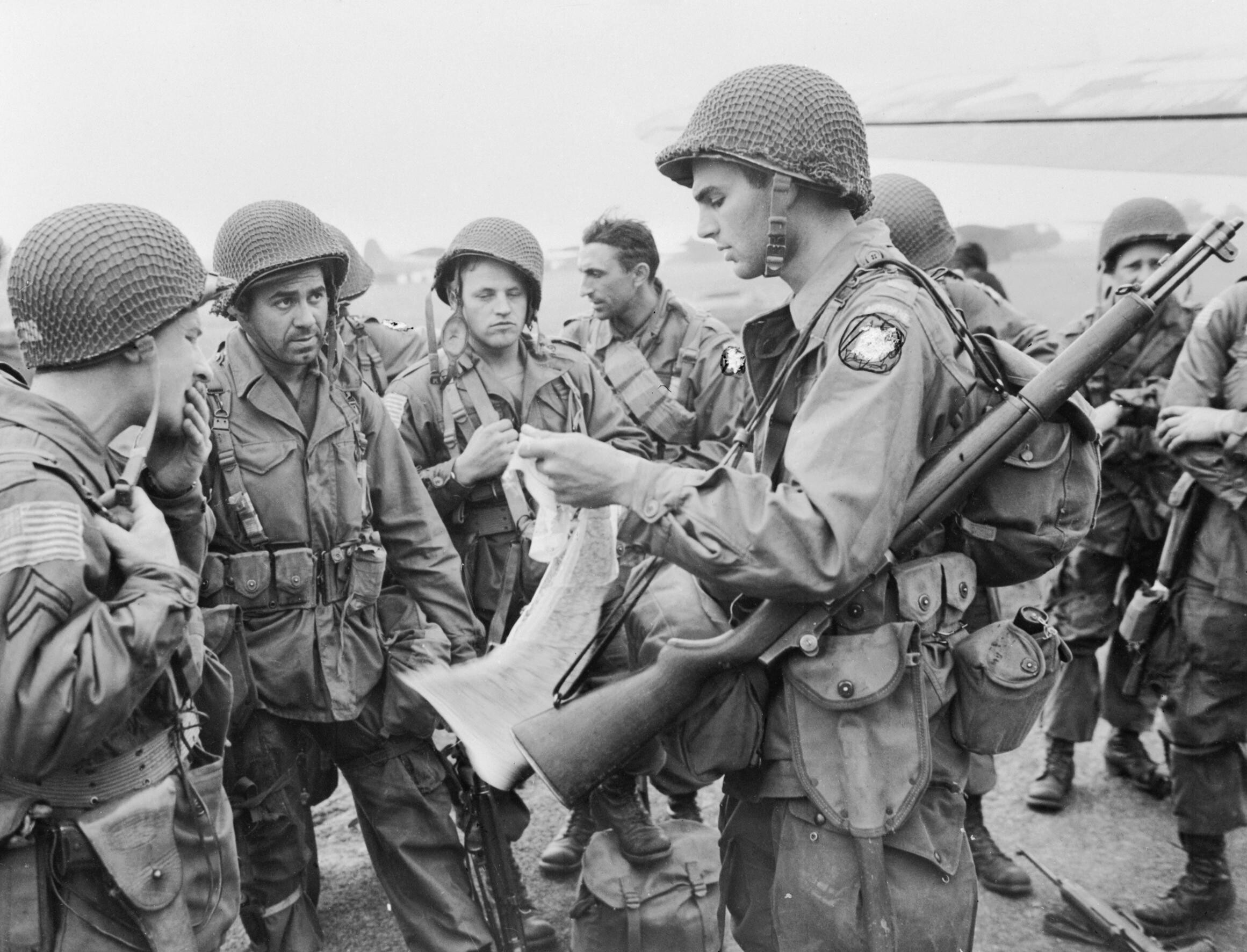
American paratroopers of the First Allied Airborne Army, 17 September 1944

Operation Market-Garden was an expanded version of the cancelled Operation Comet utilizing three divisions of 1st Allied Airborne Army (101st Airborne Division, 82nd Airborne Division and 1st Airborne Division).

The driving force behind the creation of Market Garden was Field Marshal Bernard Montgomery, who disagreed with the 'broad front' strategy favoured by Eisenhower, in which all Allied armies in North-West Europe advanced simultaneously. Montgomery believed that a single thrust should be launched against the German forces. Allied forces under Montgomery's overall command would move through the Netherlands over the river crossings captured by the airborne forces, outflank the Siegfried Line, enter the North German Plain, and form the northern arm of a pincer attack on the Ruhr.

Market Garden was to punch a salient 62 miles (100 km) long from the Dutch/Belgian border to Arnhem on the River Rhine. Market Garden consisted of two components, 'Market' – the airborne assault to seize key bridges which was to be carried out by First Allied Airborne Army, and 'Garden', the ground attack – primarily XXX Corps of the British Second Army – which would relieve the airborne units in turn and establish the corridor. The 101st would take the crossings at the Maas (Meuse), the 82nd the Waal at Nijmegen and British 1st Airborne the Nederrijn (Lower Rhine) at Arnhem. The landings began on 17 September. The 101st took their objectives and XXX (delayed by a destroyed bridge at Son) crossed the Maas on 20 September. The 82nd did not take the bridge at Nijmegen until 20 September and XXX did not cross in force until the following day.

The operation succeeded in liberating the Dutch cities of Eindhoven and Nijmegen. Although reaching the River Rhine the operation failed in establishing a bridgehead over the river. 1st Airborne Division reached the vital Arnhem bridge denying it to German traffic, however being evacuated on 25 September after sustaining heavy casualties as the ground forces were delayed in relieving them.

=== Battle of the Bulge ===
With the failure of Operation Market-Garden, the Allied advance came to a halt, replaced by several months of almost static combat against defending German forces, with no Allied airborne operations being planned or executed. This period was broken, however, when a major offensive was launched by the Germans on the orders of Adolf Hitler; on 16 December 1944 Operation "Watch on the Rhine began, with three German armies attacking through the Ardennes, hundreds of thousands of German troops and tanks breaking through Allied line on the American sector. The operation took the Allied forces completely by surprise, and several units under the command of First Allied Airborne Army became involved in the Allied attempt to first halt, and then repel the offensive; these units were principally the 101st Airborne Division, 82nd Airborne Division, 17th Airborne Division and the 6th Airborne Division.

With the end of the participation of the 101st, 17th and 82nd Airborne Divisions in repelling the German counter-attack in the Ardennes between December 1944 and January 1945, the airborne forces under the command of First Allied Airborne Army would not participate in another airborne operation until March.

=== Operation Varsity ===
By March 1945, the Allied armies had advanced into Germany and had reached the River Rhine. The Rhine was a formidable natural obstacle to the Allied advance, but if breached would allow the Allies to access the North German Plain and ultimately advance on Berlin and other major cities in Northern Germany. Field Marshal Bernard Montgomery, commanding the British 21st Army Group devised a plan to allow the forces under his command to breach the Rhine, entitled Operation Plunder and First Allied Airborne Army was tasked to support it in an operation code-named Operation Varsity.

Three airborne divisions were initially assigned to take part in Varsity: the British 6th Airborne Division, the US 13th Airborne Division and the US 17th Airborne Division, subordinate to US XVIII Airborne Corps. However, it became apparent that the 13th Airborne Division would be unable to participate in the operation, as there were only enough transport aircraft available to transport two divisions. The plan for the operation was therefore altered employ only the British 6th Airborne and the US 17th Airborne Division.

Learning from the failure of Operation Market-Garden, the plan for Operation Varsity altered the Airborne Army's tactics:

- The airborne forces would be dropped a relatively short distance behind German lines, thereby ensuring that reinforcements would be able to link up with them within a short period.
- The two airborne divisions would be dropped simultaneously in a single "lift", instead of being dropped over several days as happened during Operation Market Garden. Because of this, Operation Varsity would be the largest single-drop airborne operation conducted during WW2.
- Supply drops for the airborne forces would be made as soon as possible to ensure adequate supplies were available to the airborne troops as they fought.
- The airborne troops would drop after the initial amphibious landings.

The ground forces taking part in Operation Plunder began their attack at 21:00 on 23 March 1945, and secured a number of crossings on the eastern bank of the Rhine overnight. The two airborne divisions then deployed for Operation Varsity, landing at 10:00 on 24 March 1945, near the town of Hamminkeln. They were tasked with a number of objectives: seizing the Diersfordter Wald, a forest that overlooked the Rhine and had a road linking several towns together; securing several bridges over the River IJssel, and capturing Hamminkeln.

All of the objectives were captured and held within a few hours of the operation beginning, and by nightfall of 24 March, 15th (Scottish) Infantry Division had joined up with elements of 6th Airborne. By 27 March, the Allies had 14 divisions on the east bank of the river. General Eisenhower later stated that Operation Varsity was "the most successful airborne operation carried out to date".

=== Further cancelled operations ===
Several airborne operations were planned for the divisions under the control of First Allied Airborne Army after the end of Operation Varsity.

- Operation Arena envisioned landing between six and ten divisions into what was termed a 'strategic airhead' in the Kassel region of Northern Germany in order to deny a large swathe of territory to the German defenders and give the Allied armies a staging area for further advances into Germany. The 13th was chosen to participate, along with the US 17th, 82nd and 101st Airborne Divisions, as well as the British 6th Airborne Division and the 1st Airborne Division. A preliminary date for 1 May was set for the operation once all of the required airborne and air-landed infantry divisions had been located and supplied, but it was ultimately cancelled on 26 March due to the rapid movement of Allied ground forces negating the requirement for the operation.
- Operation Choker II was to be an airborne landing on the east bank of the Rhine near Worms, Germany, and during which the division was only hours from taking off before the operation was cancelled due to Allied ground forces overrunning the proposed landing areas.
- Operation Effective was designed to deny the Alps area from the Germans to prevent the creation of a last-ditch stronghold, but was cancelled when intelligence indicated such a stronghold did not exist.

== Disbandment ==
The First Allied Airborne Army was officially deactivated on 20 May 1945, with the British units under its command returning to the United Kingdom and the American units being renamed as First Airborne Army and taking over command of the American Sector of Occupation in Berlin.

== Constituent formations of First Allied Airborne Army ==
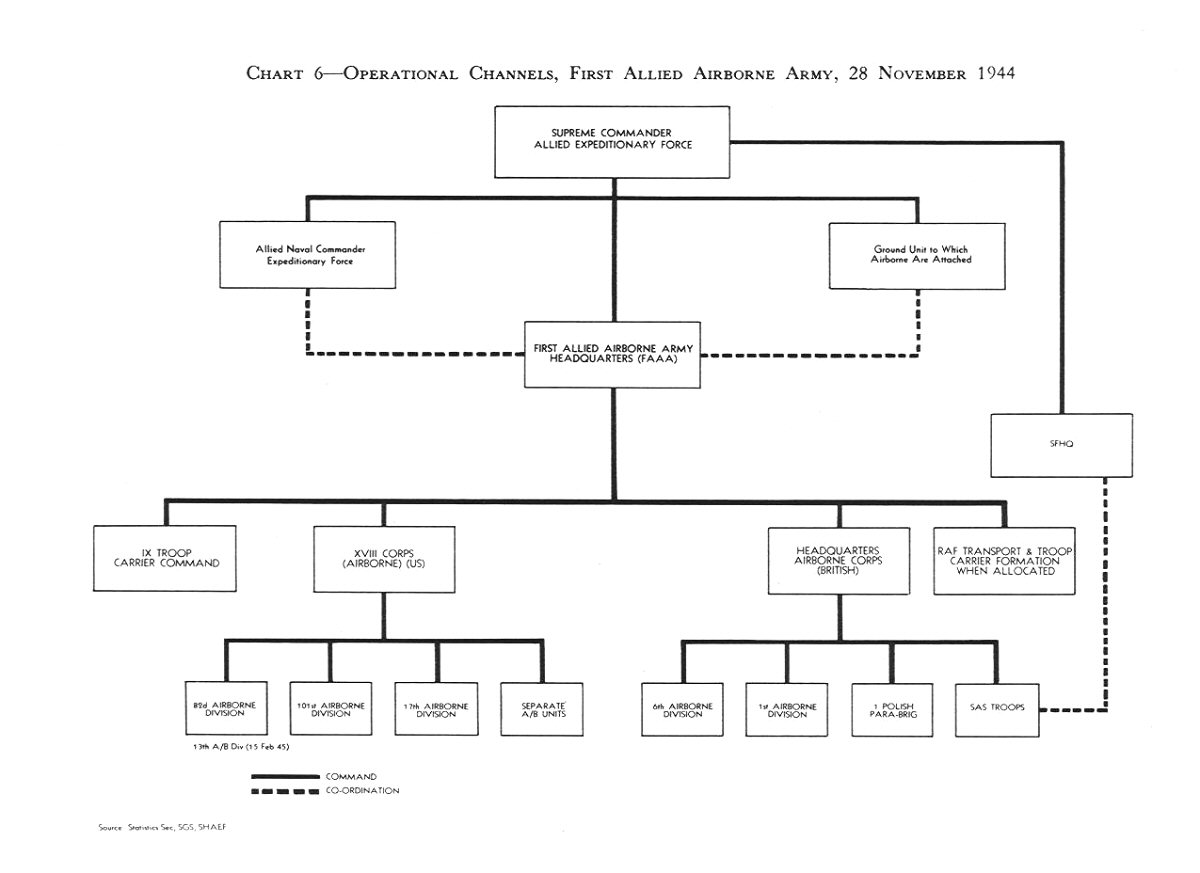
Operational Channels, First Allied Airborne Army, 28 November 1944.

- XVIII Airborne Corps
  - 13th Airborne Division (in 1945)
  - 17th Airborne Division
  - 82d Airborne Division
    - 325th Glider Infantry Regiment
    - 504th Parachute Infantry Regiment
    - 505th Parachute Infantry Regiment
  - 101st Airborne Division
- I Airborne Corps
  - 1st Airborne Division
    - 1st Parachute Brigade
    - 2nd Parachute Brigade
    - 4th Parachute Brigade
    - 1st Airlanding Brigade
  - 6th Airborne Division
    - 3rd Parachute Brigade (Note: On formation part of 1st Airborne Division but moved to 6th Airborne Division)
      - 1st Canadian Parachute Battalion
    - 5th Parachute Brigade
    - 6th Airlanding Brigade
  - 52nd (Lowland) Division (Air Transportable)
  - Special Air Service (SAS) Troops
    - 1 SAS (British)
    - 2 SAS (British)
    - 3 SAS (French)
    - 4 SAS (French)
    - 5 SAS (Belgian)
    - D Squadron GHQ Liaison Regiment
  - Polish 1st Independent Parachute Brigade
- IX Troop Carrier Command
  - 50th Troop Carrier Wing
  - 52d Troop Carrier Wing
  - 53d Troop Carrier Wing
