= 6th Airborne Division advance to the River Seine =

1944 Allied military operation in WWII

- Part of the Battle of Normandy
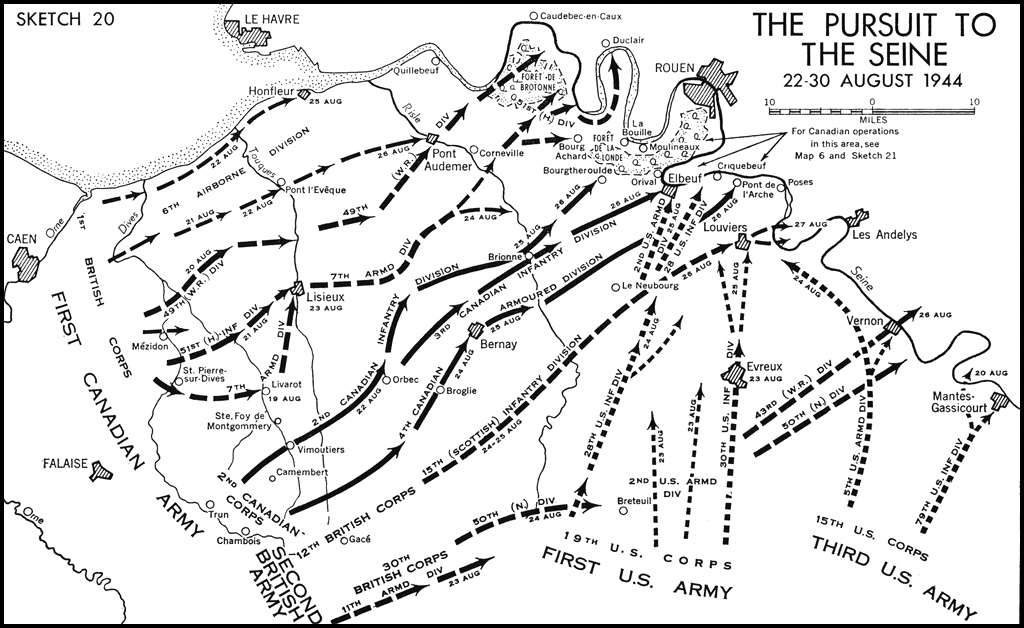
- Map of the First Canadian Army's advance, August 1944.
Date	August 1944
Location	Normandy, France
Result	Allied victory
Territorial changes	Land between the River Dives and the River Seine liberated

Belligerents
United Kingdom	Germany

Commanders and leaders
(United Kingdom) Richard Nelson Gale	(Nazi Germany) Josef Reichert

Units involved
6th Airborne Division	711th Infantry Division

Casualties and losses
4,457	Unknown
- British casualties are from the start of the campaign, 6 June 1944

The 6th Airborne Division advance to the River Seine occurred in August 1944, in the later stages of the Battle of Normandy, following the German Army's defeat in the Falaise Pocket, during the Second World War.

The British 6th Airborne Division, under the command of Major-General Richard Nelson Gale, was one of the first Allied units to arrive in Normandy on D-Day, 6 June 1944, and successfully secured the left flank of the invasion zone. Resisting efforts to dislodge them by the combined efforts of two infantry and one panzer division, a month later they were ordered to prepare to advance. Their objective was the mouth of the River Seine, 45 miles (72 km) away. To assist them in carrying out their mission, the division was reinforced by the 1st and 4th Special Service Brigades, the 1st Belgian Infantry Brigade and the Royal Netherlands Motorized Infantry Brigade, as well as increased artillery support. To reach the Seine, the division had to cross three rivers that had been flooded by the Germans, and had only two roads available to them.

The 6th Airborne Division began their advance on 17 August, after the German Army had started to withdraw. Fighting several small battles, by the end of the month they reached their objective at the River Seine. Here the division halted until early in September, when they returned to England to prepare for further airborne operations later in the war.

== Background ==
On 6 June 1944, the 6th Airborne Division landed in Normandy. Their mission was to secure the left flank of the invasion zone, by occupying and dominating the high ground between the River Orne and the River Dives. Despite the parachute troops being widely scattered, they managed to complete all of their objectives. After six days of counter-attacks by German armour and infantry, the division's position was secure by the end of the Battle of Breville on 12 June. Thereafter, they suffered only artillery bombardments.

Almost two months later on 7 August, the division was warned to prepare to advance. Their objective would be the mouth of the River Seine. To reinforce the lightly armed and equipped airborne division, the British 1st and 4th Special Service Brigades, together with the 1st Belgian and the Netherlands Infantry Brigades were placed under their command. Additional artillery support was provided by two field artillery regiments, a medium artillery battery, and a heavy anti-aircraft artillery regiment used in a field artillery role.

In the operation the 6th Airborne Division together with the 7th Armoured Division, the 49th (West Riding) Infantry Division and the 51st (Highland) Infantry Division, formed the I Corps, attached to the First Canadian Army. When issuing his orders, Lieutenant General John Crocker, the Corps commander, aware that the 6th Airborne had almost no artillery, vehicles or engineer equipment, did not expect them to advance quickly. To reach the River Seine the division would have to cross three main rivers, along only two main lines of advance. One route was in the north, running along the French coast, while the other route was further inland between Troarn and Pont Audemer.

By this stage of Operation Overlord, German forces were of an unknown quantity and quality, but the division would be confronted by elements of Germany's 711th Infantry Division, a part of the 15th Army. The 711th was composed of the 731st and the 744th Grenadier Infantry Regiments, together with artillery and other supporting arms. Even before the invasion the German division had not been considered a front line formation, but rather a static division on anti-invasion duties, and many of its units had not been at full strength. Furthermore, many of its troops were older than was normal in a first line division, or were conscripted foreigners from Poland and Russia. Being a static division, it was hampered further by having almost no transport of its own, and what was available was mostly horse drawn.

== Breakout ==
The three infantry formations of the British I Corps were deployed with the 6th Airborne Division on the left, nearest the coast. In the centre was the 49th Division and on the right the 51st Division. The corps advance began on 15 August when the 49th Division captured Vimont, followed on the next day by the capture of Saint-Pierre-sur-Dives by the 51st Division. On 17 August, the 6th Airborne Division advanced. The 6th Airlanding Brigade, with the Belgian and Netherlands brigades under its command, would advance along the French coastal route. The lighter forces of the 3rd and 5th Parachute and the two commando brigades would use the inland route.

When it was clear at 03:00 that the German Army in front of the division was pulling back, the first divisional unit to follow up was the 3rd Parachute Brigade. By 07:00 Bures was occupied by the 8th and 9th Parachute Battalions and by 08:00 the 1st Canadian Parachute Battalion was in the Bois de Bavent. The rest of the division started advancing around the same time. The 4th Special Service Brigade headed for Troan and Saint Pair, while the 1st Special Service Brigade made for Bavent and Robehomme. In the north, the 6th Airlanding Brigade started moving along the road from Bréville to Merville.

=== Northern sector ===
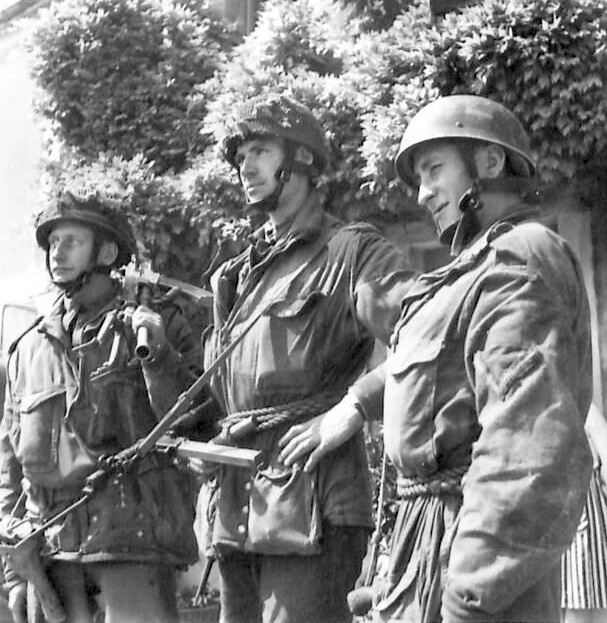
Men of the 6th Airlanding Brigade

The 6th Airlanding Brigade, with the Belgians and Dutch under its command, had to contend with German delaying tactics. The lead battalions advanced under heavy mortar and machine gun fire, until stopped by a strong defensive position at Cabourg. The 1st Battalion, Royal Ulster Rifles, unable to outflank the position, were ordered to dig in. The next day, the battalion was relieved by the Belgians and moved to a brigade concentration point, first at Le Plein and then at Troan, which they reached by the morning of 21 August. The 6th Airlanding Brigade advance continued from here with the 12th Battalion, Devonshire Regiment in the lead. The battalion was unopposed until that afternoon, when they had several casualties from German mortar and machine-gun fire. With night approaching the battalion had to dig in, and prepared to continue the advance the next day. At 03:00 on 22 August, the battalion started an outflanking attack on Branville, which they occupied by 08:00, and later the same day they liberated Vauville and Deauville, where they secured the high ground to the north of the town.

On 23 August a reconnaissance patrol from the 1st Battalion, Royal Ulster Rifles crossed the River Touques by boat, but German resistance in the area was too heavy for the battalion to cross. Instead they moved upriver, intending to cross at Bonnerville sur Touques. Intelligence reported that the railway embankment on the river was held in force by the Germans, and this put attempts to cross the river there on hold. Elsewhere the 2nd Battalion, Oxfordshire and Buckinghamshire Light Infantry reached the river. Major John Howard and his D Company swam across and established the battalion's bridgehead. With local French assistance and a collection of small boats and rafts, the rest of the battalion were also able to cross the river, entering Touques on 24 August. The next day they liberated Saint Philibert, La Correspondence and Petiville, and reached Malhortie where the Germans were still defending the bridge and high ground. At 13:00, the battalion assaulted and captured the bridge intact, but German resistance prevented them from proceeding any further. On 26 August the advance continued, and at 19:00 Foulbec was liberated. Circumstances had divided the 6th Airlanding Brigade's forces, and they were now advancing along two routes, with the Belgian and Dutch brigades along the coast and the airlanding battalions further inland. The 6th Airlanding Brigade battalions headed towards Honfleur and Berville sur Mer, meeting slight German opposition, while the Belgians occupied the area around Berville and Foulbec.

=== Southern sector ===
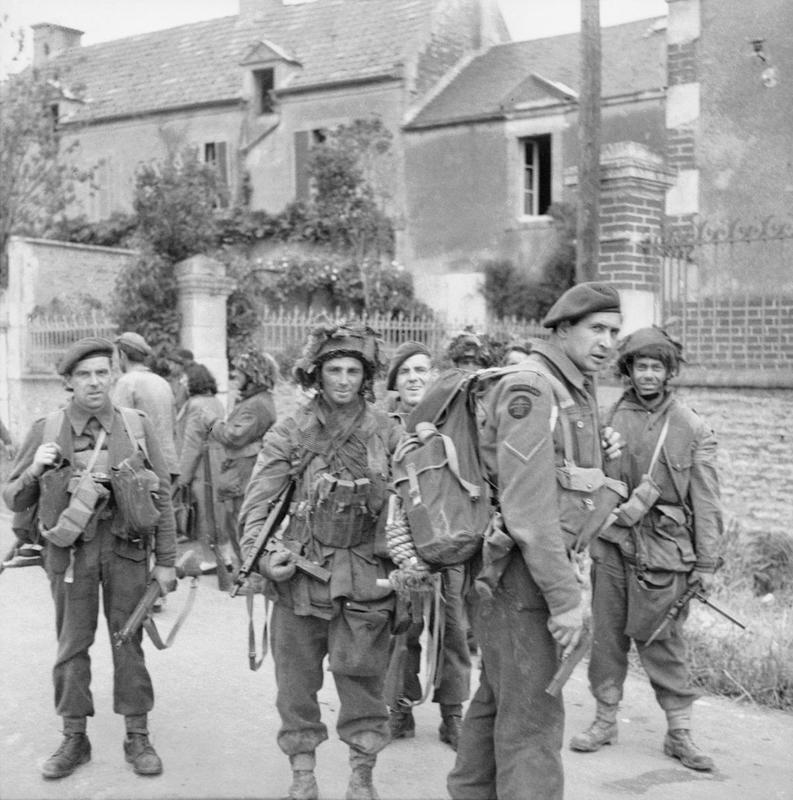
British commando and parachute troops in Normandy

In the south, the 3rd Parachute Brigade started crossing the River Dives on 18 August, delayed by the need to build a crossing to replace the bridge destroyed by the division during Operation Tonga. By nightfall the 1st Canadian Parachute Battalion was engaging the German rearguard and the 8th Parachute Battalion reached the outskirts of Goustranville. The next morning the brigade advance continued into Goustranville, where they came under heavy artillery fire from the high ground at Putot. Their attack faltered and Gale decided to restart the advance that night. He ordered the 3rd Parachute Brigade to secure the start point along the Dives canal and railway line, while the 5th Parachute Brigade assaulted the artillery position at Putot.

At 22:00 the 3rd Parachute Brigade moved forward, capturing the two canal bridges intact, and 150 prisoners from the 744th Grenadier Regiment. By 01:00 on 19 August, they were on the outskirts of Dozule, but were then targeted by German artillery, causing several casualties. At the same time the 5th Parachute Brigade crossed the canal further south. The 7th Parachute Battalion were ordered to secure the area to the east of Putot-en-Auge, while the 12th Parachute Battalion assaulted the village. En route, the 7th Parachute Battalion came under fire from German machine-guns, then observed a line of troops approaching them. Initially thought to be the 13th Parachute Battalion they were soon identified as Germans, and the battalion ambushed them at a distance of 25 yards (23 m), causing severe casualties to the Germans.

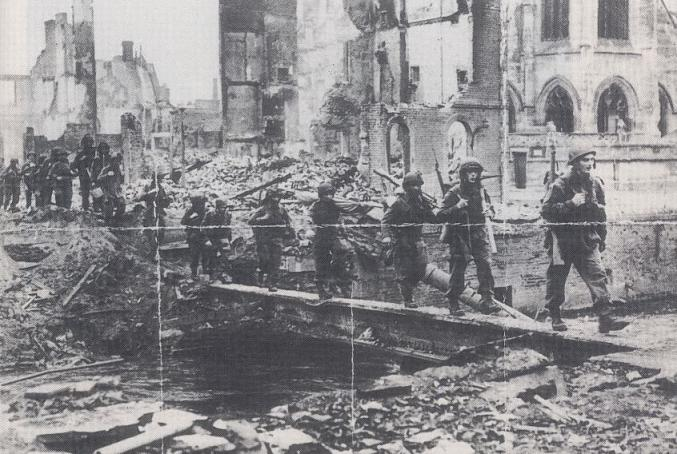
Men of the 6th Airborne Division crossing the remnants of the final bridge at Pont L'Eveque on 24 August. The devastation caused during the two-day battle, particularly due to the fires, is plain to see.

When the 13th Parachute Battalion advanced close enough to Hill 13, they carried out a bayonet charge on the summit. However, they arrived at the same time as a battalion of German reinforcements, who immediately counter-attacked, forcing the battalion back, inflicting several casualties. A follow-up attack by the Germans on the withdrawing British was stopped by an artillery barrage. During this time the 12th Parachute Battalion captured Putot-en-Auge, taking 160 prisoners and several heavy weapons.

The next day, 21 August, the 3rd Parachute Brigade advanced towards the River Touques at Pont-l'Évêque, fighting through a German infantry and armour position at Annebault. The village was eventually captured by the 8th Parachute Battalion after some heavy fighting. Here the brigade held firm while the 5th Parachute Brigade moved through them, and reached Pont-l'Évêque on 22 August. The 13th Parachute Battalion then led the brigade attack into the town; their objective was to cross both branches of the Touques in the town and form a bridgehead on the northern bank. At the same time the 12th Parachute Battalion would cross further upriver and secure a railway embankment at Saint Julien. At 15:00 the Royal Artillery laid down a smoke barrage to cover the advance of the 12th Parachute Battalion. The Germans opened fire when they were around 400 yards (370 m) from the river; only ten men from the battalion succeeded in crossing, and then became trapped on the far bank. Running low on ammunition, and without support, they eventually withdrew. The 13th Parachute Battalion fought its way into the town and across the first branch of the river, but German resistance was heavy and they could not get across the eastern branch.

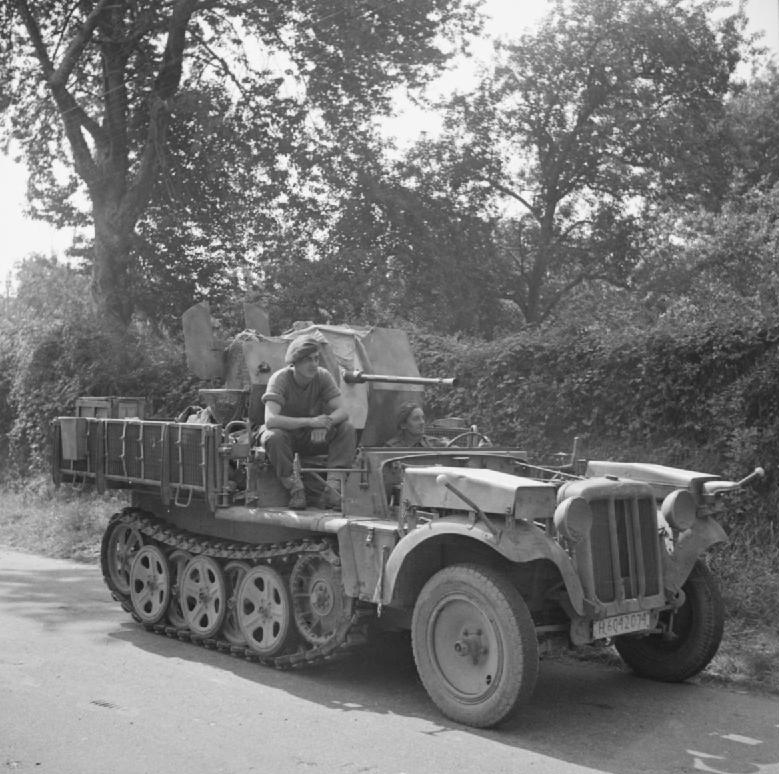
A captured German half track mounting a 20 mm gun, which was used by the 6th Airborne Division to shoot down an attacking aircraft on 28 August 1944

On 22 August a patrol from the 13th Parachute Battalion succeeded in crossing the eastern branch of the river, and was quickly reinforced by the rest of the battalion. They fought for three hours to gain a proper foothold and were then forced to withdraw again. The next day, patrols from the 7th Parachute Battalion discovered that the Germans had withdrawn during the night, and they therefore crossed the river and secured the high ground to the north, closely followed by the rest of the brigade. On 25 August the 1st Special Service Brigade took over as the lead formation, and headed towards Beuzeville, but once again German defences held up the advance. The 3rd Parachute Brigade and the 4th Special Service Brigade carried out a left flanking attack to capture the village, suffering heavy losses from German mortar fire.

Later that day, Gale received orders that the 49th (West Riding) Infantry Division would take Pont Audemer. Convinced he was in a better position to capture the crossing over the River Risle there, he ordered the Netherlands Infantry Brigade to move and join the 5th Parachute Brigade in taking the town. On 26 August the men of the parachute brigade, some mounted on the Cromwell tanks of the 6th Airborne Armoured Reconnaissance Regiment, raced towards the bridge from the east while the Dutch headed there from the west. The Dutch brigade arrived first, just minutes after the Germans destroyed the bridge, slightly ahead of the 7th Parachute Battalion. The Dutch brigade moved to secure the heights overlooking the river, while the 5th Parachute Brigade occupied the town.

=== River Seine ===
Having reached the River Seine, the division was ordered to hold firm between Honfleur and Pont Audemer and prepare to return to England. In nine days of fighting they had advanced 45 miles (72 km), despite, as the divisional commander Major-General Gale put it, his infantry units being "quite inadequately equipped for a rapid pursuit," captured 400 square miles (1,000 km^{2}) of German held territory, and took more than 1,000 German prisoners. Since landing on 6 June, the division's casualties were 4,457, of which 821 were killed, 2,709 wounded and 927 missing. The division was withdrawn from France, and embarked for England at the beginning of September.
