= Johnny Johnson (British Army officer) =

British Army officer (died 12 June 1944)

Alexander Percival Johnson DSO (died 12 June 1944, aged 32), known as Johnny Johnson, was a British Army officer.

The son of Lieutenant-Colonel Henry Alexander Johnson and Constance Bertha Johnson, Alexander was born in 1911. He was educated in Switzerland where he took up skiing and climbing before later attending the Royal Military College, Sandhurst.

From Sandhurst, Johnson was originally commissioned into the Suffolk Regiment in the 1931 and qualified at the Staff College, Camberley at decade later.

During World War II he became Commanding officer of the 12th (Yorkshire) Battalion of the Parachute Regiment, serving as part of 5th Parachute Brigade of the 6th Airborne Division, during the Battle of Normandy. He and his division parachuted into Normandy in the early morning of 6 June 1944 as part of Operation Tonga. The 12th Battalion formed a defensive line south of the bridge at Ranville. On 6 and 7 June, the battalion defended the bridgehead against attacks by the German 21st Panzer Division moving north from Caen. Many casualties were caused by heavy fire from enemy machine guns, mortars, artillery, self-propelled guns, and tanks. For his leadership during this defensive stand, Johnson was posthumously awarded the Distinguished Service Order.

In the afternoon of 12 June, Lieutenant Colonel Johnson was ordered to hastily prepare his battalion for an attack on the village of Bréville (currently named Bréville-les-Monts). At 21:45, the battalion assembled on the start line near Amfréville and an artillery barrage on enemy positions near Bréville began. Lieutenant Colonel Johnson was conferring with a group of senior officers when he was killed by a stray artillery round. Also wounded by the blast were Brigadier Hugh Kindersley and Colonel Reginald Parker of 6th Airlanding Brigade and Brigadier The Lord Lovat of 1st Special Service Brigade.

== Sources ==
- Houterman, Hans. "World War II Unit Histories and Officers".
- Hickman, Mark. "Pegasus Archive".
- Bernage, Georges (2002). Red Devils in Normandy. Heimdal. p. 9. ISBN 2-84048-159-6.
