= Battle of Bréville =

Battle of the invasion of Normandy in WWII

Coordinates: 49°14′25.0″N 0°13′33.8″W

- Part of Operation Overlord
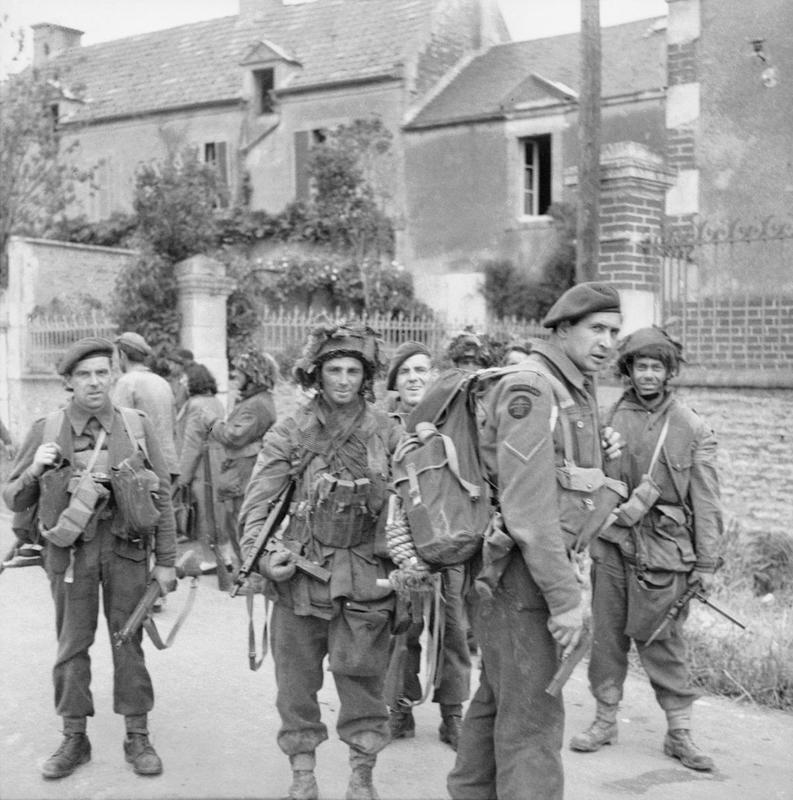
- British Parachute and Commando troops in Normandy, June 1944
Date	7–13 June 1944
Location	Bréville-les-Monts, France
Result	British Victory

Belligerents
United Kingdom	Germany

Commanders and leaders
(United Kingdom) Richard Nelson Gale (United Kingdom) Johnny Johnson † (United Kingdom) Lord Lovat (WIA)	(Nazi Germany) Erich Diestel

Units involved
6th Airborne Division	346th Infantry Division

Casualties and losses
162 Dead ^	Over 400 confirmed dead
- ^ Numbers for the final attack 12 June

The Battle of Bréville was fought by the British 6th Airborne Division and the German 346th Infantry Division, between 8 and 13 June 1944, during the early phases of the invasion of Normandy in the Second World War.

In June 1944, units of the 346th Infantry Division occupied Bréville-les-Monts, a village on a watershed between the rivers Orne and Dives. From this vantage point, they could observe the positions of the 6th Airborne Division, defending the River Orne and Caen Canal bridges and beyond them the British Sword at Ouistreham. Following several German attacks on British positions from Bréville-les-Monts, the capture of the village became essential to secure the 6th Airborne Division positions and protect the Allied beachhead.

The British attack occurred over the night of 12/13 June 1944, when Major-General Richard Nelson Gale committed his only reserves, the 12th (Yorkshire) Parachute Battalion, a company from the 12th Battalion, Devonshire Regiment and the 22nd Independent Parachute Company. To support the attack, a tank squadron from the 13th/18th Royal Hussars and five regiments of artillery were assigned to the division. The assault had to negotiate both the British and German artillery fire, which killed or wounded several men, including some senior officers. The attackers eventually reached and secured the village. However, every officer or sergeant major who took part in the attack was killed or wounded.

After the capture of Bréville, the Germans never seriously attempted to break through the airborne division's lines again. The British division only being subjected to sporadic artillery and mortar fire. This lasted until 17 August, when the Germans started to withdraw and the 6th Airborne Division advanced to the River Seine.

== Background ==
On 6 June 1944, the 6th Airborne Division landed in Normandy to secure the left flank of the British landing zone. The division's objectives were to capture intact the Caen Canal bridge, the Orne River bridge, destroy the Merville gun battery – which was in a position to engage troops landing at the nearby Sword Beach – and the bridges crossing the River Dives, the latter to prevent German reinforcements approaching the landings from the east.

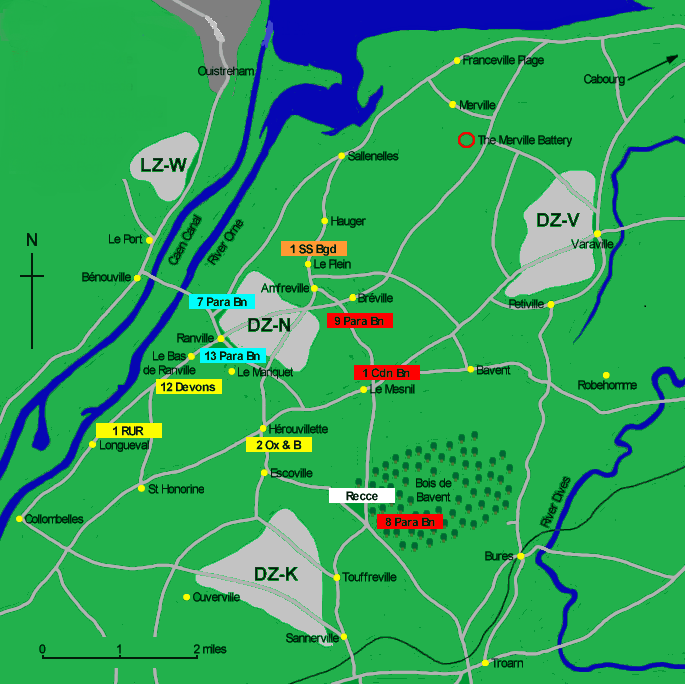
Positions of the 6th Airborne Division from 7 June 1944

The division's two parachute brigades, landing in the early hours of 6 June, were scattered across the countryside during the parachute drop. Most of the battalions could only muster around sixty per cent or less of their total strength on the drop zones (DZ). They did carry out all of their objectives, however, before the 6th Airlanding Brigade arrived by gliders to reinforce them at 21:00 that evening.

The 6th Airborne Division, now with the commandos of the 1st Special Service Brigade under command, had to defend the Orne bridgehead. This was not an easy task as it had to face elements of the 21st Panzer Division from the south and the 346th and 711th Infantry Divisions from the east.

The airborne division's brigades prepared to hold the positions they had captured, with the 5th Parachute Brigade, as the division's depth formation, dug into the east of the River Orne bridge. The 6th Airlanding Brigade was in the south between Longueval and Hérouvillette.

The two remaining brigades dug in along a ridge of high ground that, if lost, offered the Germans a position to look down on the British landing zone. The 1st Special Service Brigade was in the north on a line from Hameau Oger to Le Plein. In between the commandos and the airlanding brigade was the 3rd Parachute Brigade.

Their defensive line, however, was incomplete, as the small village of Bréville-les-Monts, between the commandos and the 3rd Parachute Brigade, was held by the Germans. Located on the ridge line it gave the Germans a view into Ranville, at the heart of the British position, the two captured bridges and in the distance Sword.

== Battle ==
=== 7/8 June ===
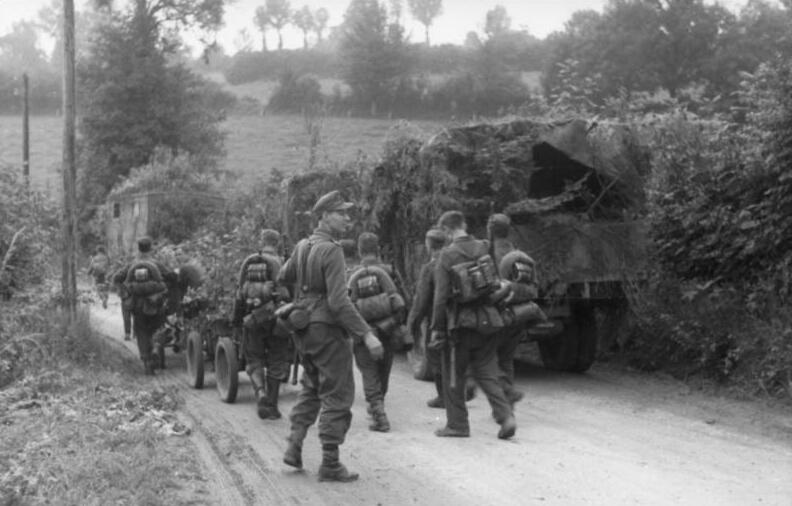
German troops moving towards the front

At 01:30 on 7 June, the 9th Parachute Battalion, with only around ninety men, marched through the unoccupied village of Bréville. Upon arrival at the 3rd Parachute Brigade's position, the 9th Battalion dug in at the northern end of the brigade line, to defend an area from the Château St Come, across a clearing in the woods, to a house known as the Bois de Mont. To their front was a stretch of open land leading to Bréville-les-Monts and the road from Amfreville to Le Mesnil-les-Monts. A shortage in their numbers left a large gap between the 9th Parachute Battalion and No. 6 Commando, the most southern unit in the commando defensive position, to their north.

The German 346th Infantry Division reached the area from its base at Le Havre. Their first attack, by the 744th Grenadier Regiment, was against the 1st Special Service Brigade. Attacking in strength, they were near to breaking through the line when No. 3 Commando counter-attacked and drove them back. Later in the morning, No. 6 Commando came under artillery and mortar fire from Bréville. The commandos attacked and cleared the village of Germans, capturing several prisoners, some machine-guns and four artillery pieces. Then they withdrew to their original position. The Germans reoccupied the village and formed their own defensive positions, facing the ridge line defended by 6th Airborne Division. Their positions also isolated the 9th Parachute Battalion, which was almost cut off from the rest of the division. The next day a patrol from the 9th Parachute Battalion reconnoitred the Château Saint Come. They found it abandoned, but the presence of clothing, equipment, a half-eaten meal and a payroll containing 50,000 French francs betrayed the recent German occupancy.

Units of the 857th Grenadier Regiment, part of the 346th Infantry Division, attacked the battalion's position at midday. It appeared to be only a probing attack, easily fought off by 'A' Company. Later the same day the Germans attacked 'A' and 'C' Companies. This time they were repelled by Vickers machine gun fire and a counter-attack by the battalion's anti-tank platoon, with a Bren machine gun group under command of the Regimental Sergeant Major.

=== 9 June ===
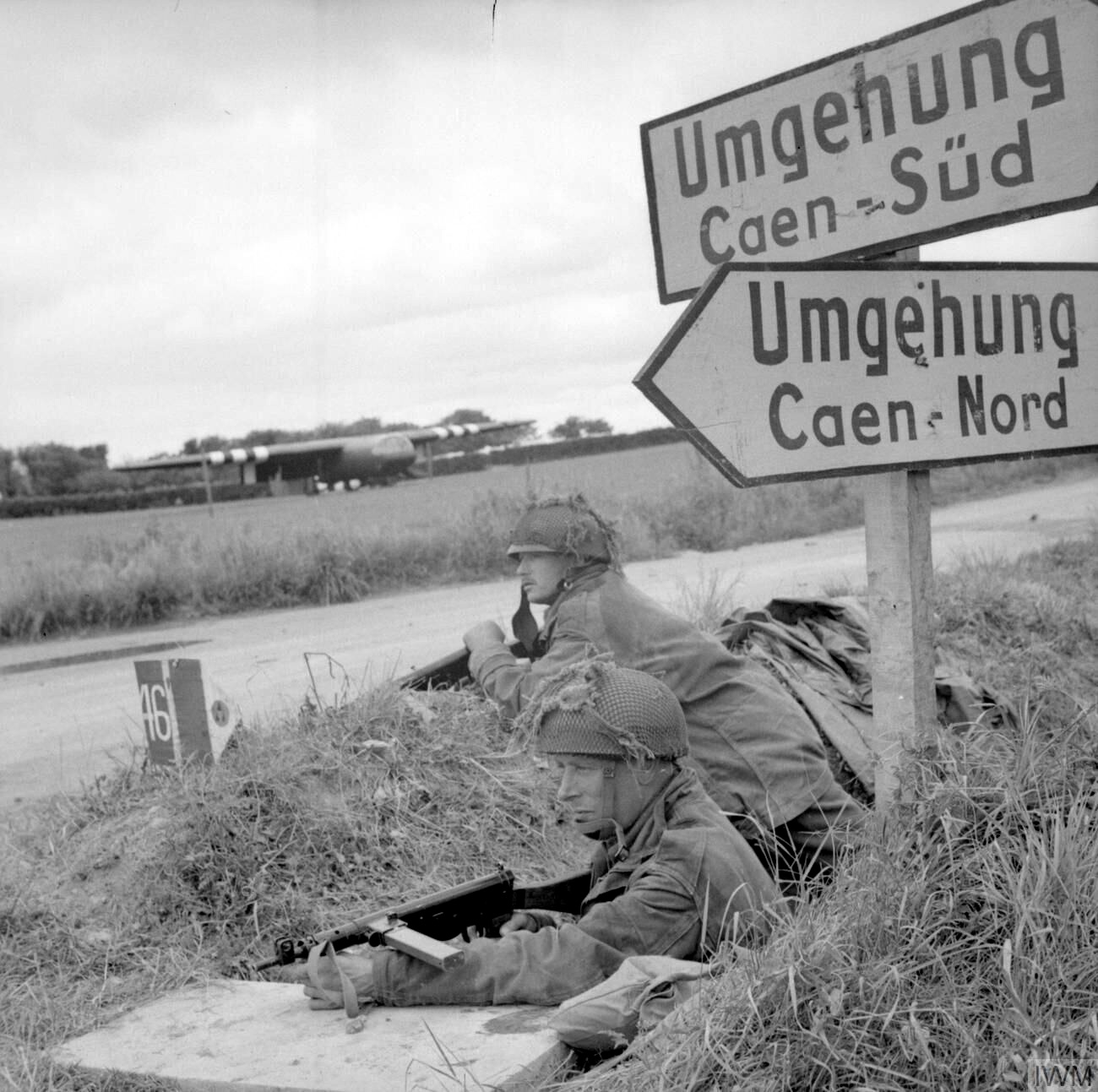
Two soldiers of the 6th Airborne Division man a trench beside the Caen road just outside Ranville

The next German attack was at dawn on 9 June, when a heavy mortar bombardment landed on the 9th Parachute Battalion positions. (Note: The British later calculated that eighty per cent of all their casualties in Normandy, came from German mortars.) Then 'A' and 'C' Companies were attacked simultaneously. After suffering many casualties, the Germans retreated into the woods surrounding the Château, where they reformed and made another abortive attack an hour later.

Brigade Headquarters was attacked by a force of Germans that had infiltrated through the woods and Lieutenant Colonel Terence Otway, the commanding officer of 9th Parachute Battalion, collected 'C' Company, his headquarters staff and a small group armed with captured German MG 42 machine-guns. They approached the Germans from the rear and trapped them in a crossfire, killing nineteen and capturing one. That afternoon two infantry platoons attacked 'A' Company but were repulsed by a counter-attack from 'C' Company's position.

At 17:30 a flight of Luftwaffe Focke-Wulf Fw 190s attacked the Orne bridgehead, causing little in the way of any damage. Soon afterward, Royal Air Force Short Stirling bombers arrived to carry out a parachute supply drop for the division. Included in the parachute drop were 6 pounder anti-tank guns, which until then had always been delivered by glider. Some forty-one of the 9th Parachute Battalion's missing men arrived at their position at 21:00, bringing the battalion strength up to around 200 men.

=== 10 June ===
A reconnaissance patrol from the 13th Parachute Battalion reported a large gathering of Germans in Bréville and suspected an attack was imminent. At 08:00 a massive artillery and mortar bombardment fell along the 1st Special Service Brigade lines, while the 857th Grenadier Regiment, which had gathered in the village, attacked No. 6 Commando. By 10:30, the attack on No. 6 Commando had been driven back, but to their left at Hauger No.4 Commandos had to win a hand-to-hand fight before the Germans withdrew. Twice more during the day the commandos were attacked unsuccessfully, from Sallenelles in the north and again from Bréville.

At 09:00 one battalion of the 857th Grenadier Regiment had crossed the drop zone and approached the 5th Parachute Brigades positions. Its two forward units, the 7th Parachute Battalion and the 13th Parachute Battalion, held their fire until the Germans were only 50 yards (46 m) away. The few survivors of the onslaught escaped into the nearby woods.

Early on 10 June another group of thirty-one men arrived at the 9th Parachute Battalion position. These and other stragglers, who had arrived through the night, brought the battalion strength to around 270 men. At 11:00 the Germans attacked 'A' Company again, but this time the attack was ill-coordinated and was easily repelled. Shortly afterwards the battalion killed around fifty Germans, who had started digging defences in full view of the British position. Then 'A' Company ambushed a German patrol, causing several casualties. That afternoon a strong force of Germans occupied the Château and used it as a base to start an infantry and self propelled gun assault on the British battalion. With no mortar ammunition left, the British had to use their PIAT anti-tank weapons and machine-guns to stop the attack.

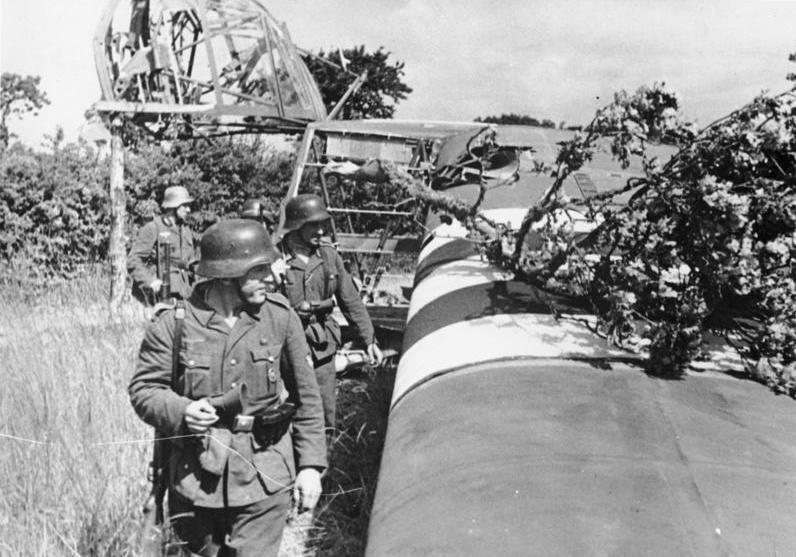
German patrol moving past a crashed Waco Hadrian glider

The next German attack was in force, using the 2nd Battalion, 857th Grenadier Regiment, the 1st and 2nd Battalions 858th Grenadier Regiment and several companies of the 744th Grenadier Regiment with tank and armoured car support. They attempted to force a gap in the British lines between the commandos and the 3rd Parachute Brigade to reach Ranville.

Two infantry companies attacked 'B' Company 9th Parachute Battalion's position. This assault was more determined, even naval gunfire support from the 6-inch (150 mm) guns of HMS Arethusa did not stop the attack. When they reached the British position a hand-to-hand fight ensued, during which most of the Germans were killed. One of the prisoners taken was the commander of the 2nd Battalion 857th Grenadier Regiment, who informed his captors that "his regiment had been destroyed in the fighting against the airborne division". The rest of the German assault came up against the 1st Canadian Parachute Battalion, and was stopped by an artillery bombardment; two later attacks on them suffered the same fate. Later at 23:00 'C' Company 9th Parachute Battalion fought their way to and occupied the Château, and fought off several small attacks throughout the night.

With his two parachute brigades and the commando brigade heavily engaged Major General Richard Gale contacted I Corps for armour support. He had decided to clear the woods at Le Mariquet of Germans. The objective was given to the 7th Parachute Battalion and 'B' Squadron 13th/18th Royal Hussars. The tanks would advance over the open ground, their only cover being crashed gliders. Meanwhile, 'A' and 'B' Company's would clear the woods. In the fighting the only British casualties were ten wounded in the parachute battalion, but eight men from the Hussars were killed and four Sherman medium and two Stuart light tanks were destroyed. The Germans from the 857th Grenadier Regiment, had twenty killed and 100 men surrendered, and were driven out of the woods.

The German attacks convinced Lieutenant General John Crocker, commander of I Corps, to reinforce the 6th Airborne Division, and the 51st (Highland) Infantry Division was ordered to take over the southern sector of the Orne bridgehead. At the same time the 5th Battalion Black Watch was attached to the 3rd Parachute Brigade. The Black Watch were informed to prepare for an assault to capture Bréville and formed up to the rear of the 9th Parachute Battalion, ready to begin their attack the next day.

=== 11 June ===
The Black Watch would attack Bréville from the south-west, but before the attack sent a company to take over the defence of the Château. At 04:30 supported by the guns and mortars of the airborne and highland divisions the attack began. To reach Bréville the battalion had to cross 250 yards (230 m) of open ground, and when they neared the village the British artillery ceased fire. The Germans then opened fire with their artillery, mortars and machine-guns. One company was completely wiped out by the German machine-gun fire as it advanced over the open ground. Met with such a heavy concentrated fire, the battalion suffered 200 casualties and the attack was repulsed. The survivors retreated to the Château, (Note: The 5th Battalion Black Watch had 327 casualties in their first week in Normandy, compared to 529 for the whole North African Campaign.) but were immediately counter-attacked by the 3rd Battalion, 858th Infantry Regiment, who themselves suffered heavy casualties.

That afternoon three troops of tanks from the 13th/18th Royal Hussars, were sent to reinforce the Black Watch, but they had only just started to move towards the Château when three tanks were destroyed by hidden German self-propelled guns. The other tanks were withdrawn being unable to deploy in the wooded ground around the Château. The rest of the day and night passed without another attack, but the Germans sent out reconnaissance patrols to establish the exact location of the British positions and German armoured vehicles could be heard moving up to the front during the night.

=== 12 June ===
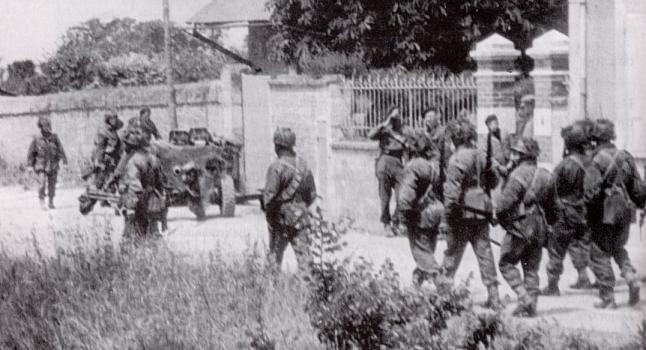
Men from the 9th Parachute Battalion in Amfreville to the west of Breville

At midday on 12 June the entire 3rd Parachute Brigade position came under artillery and mortar fire prior to a major attack scheduled to start at 15:00. A German battalion attacked the 1st Canadian Parachute Battalion, another supported by six tanks and self-propelled guns attacked the 9th Parachute Battalion and the 5th Black Watch. The battle for the Château cost the Black Watch nine Bren Gun Carriers and destroyed all of their anti-tank guns. Unable to resist they were forced to pull back to the Bois de Mont, joining the 9th Parachute Battalion, which was being attacked by the German armoured vehicles. One tank in front of 'B' Company was hit by two PIAT rounds, but remained in action. The tank destroyed two of 'B' company's machine-gun posts, when it was hit by a third anti-tank projectile and withdrew. The attack killed or wounded the last men in the Machine-Gun Platoon and the Anti-Tank Platoon was reduced to one PIAT detachment. The German infantry were in danger of over-running the battalion, when Otway contacted brigade headquarters, informing them they were not able to hold out much longer. Brigadier James Hill personally led a counter-attack of forty men from the Canadian battalion which drove off the Germans. By 20:00 the area defended by the two battalions had been cleared of all opposition and the front line restored.

=== Night Attack ===
Gale concluded that to relieve the pressure on the division, he had to take Bréville. The only units available for the attack were the division reserve, which consisted of the 12th Parachute Battalion (350 men), and 'D' Company 12th Battalion Devonshire Regiment (eighty-six men). Another unit, the 22nd Independent Parachute Company, the division's pathfinders, were to stand by and respond to any German counter-attack. To provide fire support, Gale was given A Squadron M4 Sherman tanks from the 13th/18th Royal Hussars, three field artillery regiments armed with 25 pounder guns, a medium artillery regiment of 5.5-inch guns, and the division's own artillery, the 53rd (Worcester Yeomanry) Airlanding Light Regiment. The attack on Bréville would start at 22:00, timed to catch the Germans tired and off-guard following the day's fighting. The start line was on the outskirts of Amfreville, which had already been secured by No. 6 Commando.

Lieutenant Colonel Johnny Johnson of the 12th Parachute Battalion was in command of the assault. He decided his own 'C' Company would secure the first crossroads; the Devonshire company would then take the north of the village. At the same time 'A' Company would advance through 'C' Company and secure the south-east. At the rear would be 'B' Company, the battalion reserve. The attack had to cross 400 yards (370 m) of open ground to reach the village. To support the assault and destroy a German position 200 yards (180 m) from the start line, two troop of Sherman tanks A Squadron 13/18 Hussars would accompany them.

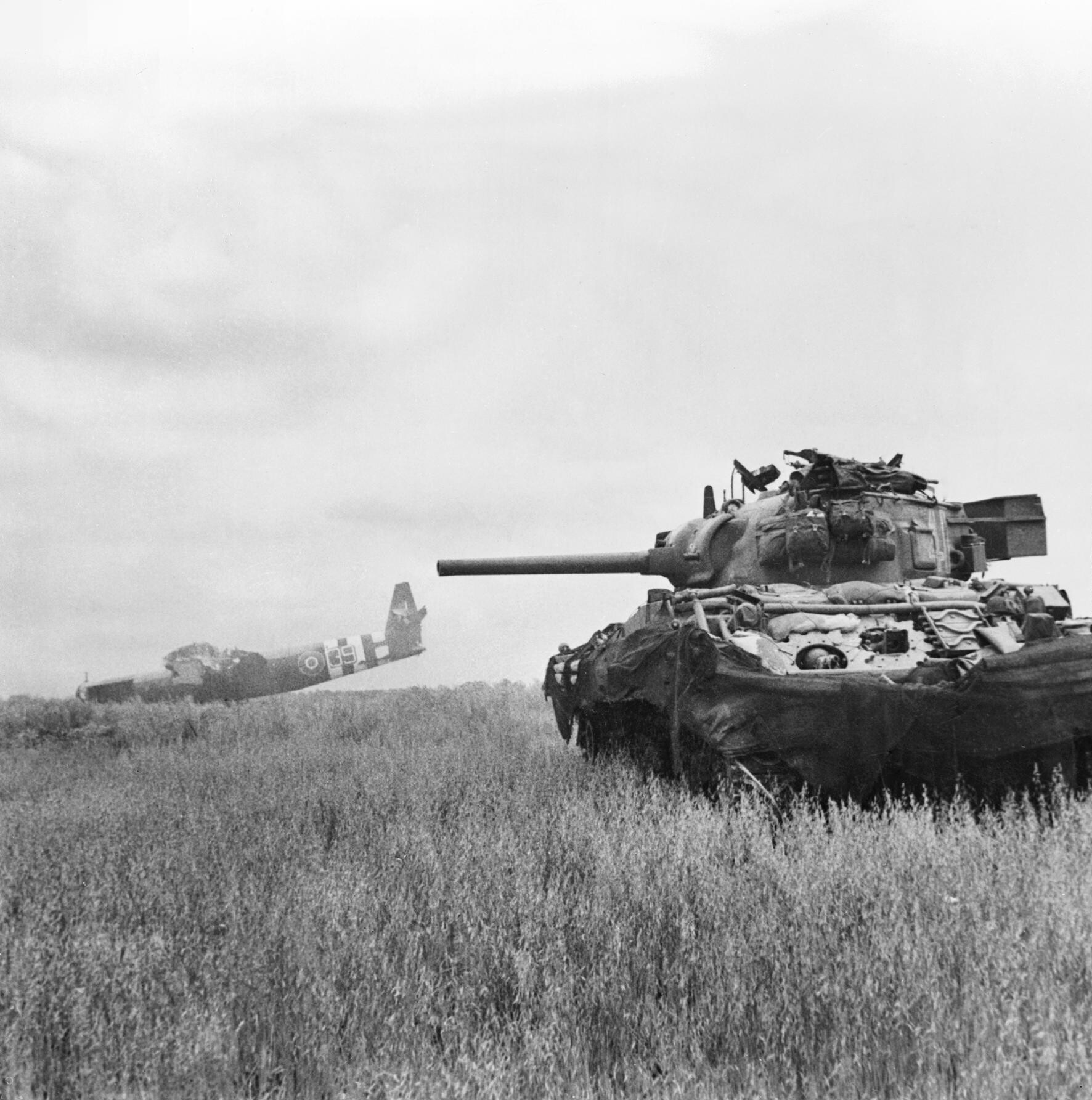
Sherman tank of the 13th/18th Royal Hussars supporting the division, with a Horsa glider in the background

At 21:50 the British artillery opened fire, and the Germans responded with their own artillery and mortars which forced most of the British to take cover, for the next fifteen minutes, until a lull in the German fire allowed them to continue. In the lead 'C' Company had crossed the start line at 22:00, however all its officers and the company sergeant major (CSM) became casualties, and senior non-commissioned officer Edmund (Eddie) Warren took command of the company. They continued to advance through the artillery and mortar bombardment, guided towards their objective by tracer rounds from the Hussar tanks. Repeatedly hit by the artillery and tanks, Bréville was in flames by the time the company's fifteen survivors reached the village.

The battalion's 'A' Company suffered a similar fate: the officer commanding was wounded crossing the start line, and at the same time every member of the 2nd Platoon was killed or wounded. The CSM assumed command of the company but was killed when they reached Bréville. The company second in command, who had been bringing up the rear, reached the village and found the 3rd Platoon only had nine men left, but they had managed to clear the village Château and the 1st Platoon had cleared its grounds.

The Devonshire company was moving towards Amfreville when an artillery round landed amongst them wounding several men. As they crossed the start line another shell landed nearby killing Johnson and their company commander Major Bampfylde, and wounding brigadiers Lord Lovat of the commando brigade and Hugh Kindersley of 6th Airlanding Brigade, who were observing the attack. Colonel Reginald Parker, deputy commander of 6th Airlanding Brigade and a former commanding officer of the 12th Parachute Battalion, had been wounded by the same shell but went forward to take over command of the attack.

By 22:45 the crossroads had been secured by what remained of 'C' Company, the eighteen survivors of 'A' Company were in among the south-eastern buildings of Bréville. In the north-east of the village the twenty survivors of the Devonshire company had captured their objective. The shelling had stopped when 'B' Company reached the village unopposed and occupied abandoned German trenches beside the church. Fearing a German counter-attack on his weakened battalion, Parker ordered a defensive artillery bombardment. However, there was a misunderstanding when the order reached the artillery and a heavy bombardment landed on the British positions in the village, causing several casualties including three of the surviving officers.

At 02:00 on 13 June the 13th/18th Royal Hussars squadron arrived at 'C' Company's position at the crossroads, later followed by fifty-one men from the 22nd Independent Parachute Company. Bréville was now in British control again for the third time since the landings on 6 June. But there were too few to defend against a German counter-attack, so the 1st Battalion Royal Ulster Rifles, part of the 6th Airlanding Brigade, was moved into the village to take over from the survivors of the attack.

== Aftermath ==
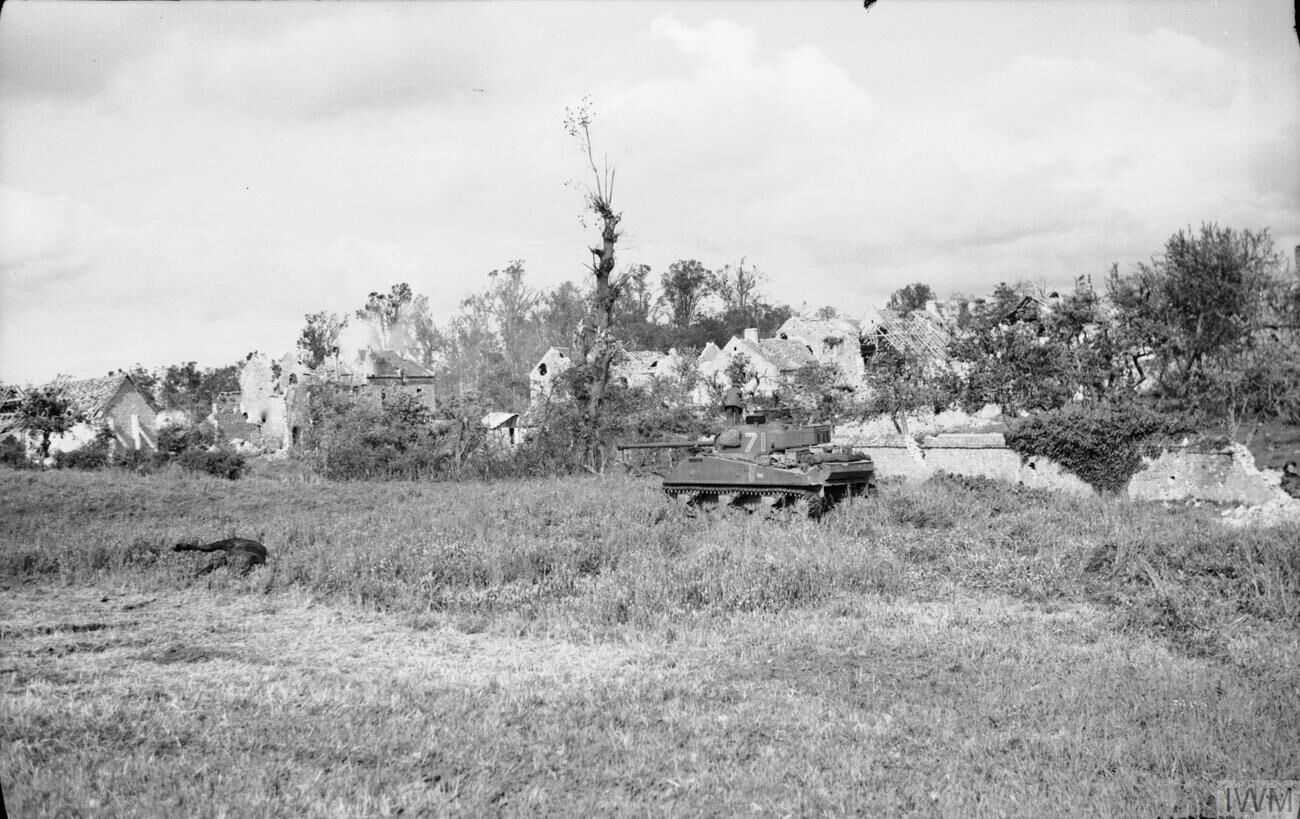
Sherman Firefly on the outskirts of the village after the battle.

The final attack had cost the 12th Parachute Battalion 31 killed and around 105 wounded, leaving its three rifle companies with only thirty-five men between them. The 12th Devonshire company had another thirty-six killed. Amongst the casualties, was every officer or warrant officer, who had either been killed or wounded. The German defenders from the 3rd Battalion 858th Grenadier Regiment, had numbered 564 men before the British assault, by the time the village had been captured there were only 146 of them left.

However the left flank of the invasion zone was now secure. On 13 June the 51st (Highland) Infantry Division took over responsibility for the southern sector of the Orne bridgehead, releasing the 6th Airlanding Brigade to strengthen the 6th Airborne Division position along the ridge line. The next two months was a period of static warfare, until 17 August when the division crossed the River Dives and advanced north along the French coast. By 26 August they had reached Honfleur at the mouth of the River Seine, capturing over 1,000 prisoners and liberating 1,000 square kilometres (390 sq mi) of France.

The battle of Breville has since been claimed to have been "one of the most important battles of the invasion". Had the division lost the battle, the Germans would have been in a position to attack the landing beaches. But after the battle the Germans never attempted a serious attack on the division again. For their accomplishment, Breville was one of six battle honours awarded to the Parachute Regiment for the Normandy Campaign.

== Notes ==
Footnotes

Citations
