= 12th (Yorkshire) Parachute Battalion =

- Cap badge of the Parachute Regiment.
- Country: United Kingdom
- Branch: British Army
- Type: Airborne forces
- Role: Parachute infantry
- Size: Battalion
- Part of: 5th Parachute Brigade
- Nickname: Red Devils
- Mottos: Bash On & Utrinque Paratus (Latin "Ready for Anything")
- Engagements: Operation Tonga; Bréville; Seine Offensive; Ardennes; Operation Varsity; Operation Tiderace

Commanders
- Notable commanders: Johnny Johnson; Sir Kenneth Darling

Insignia
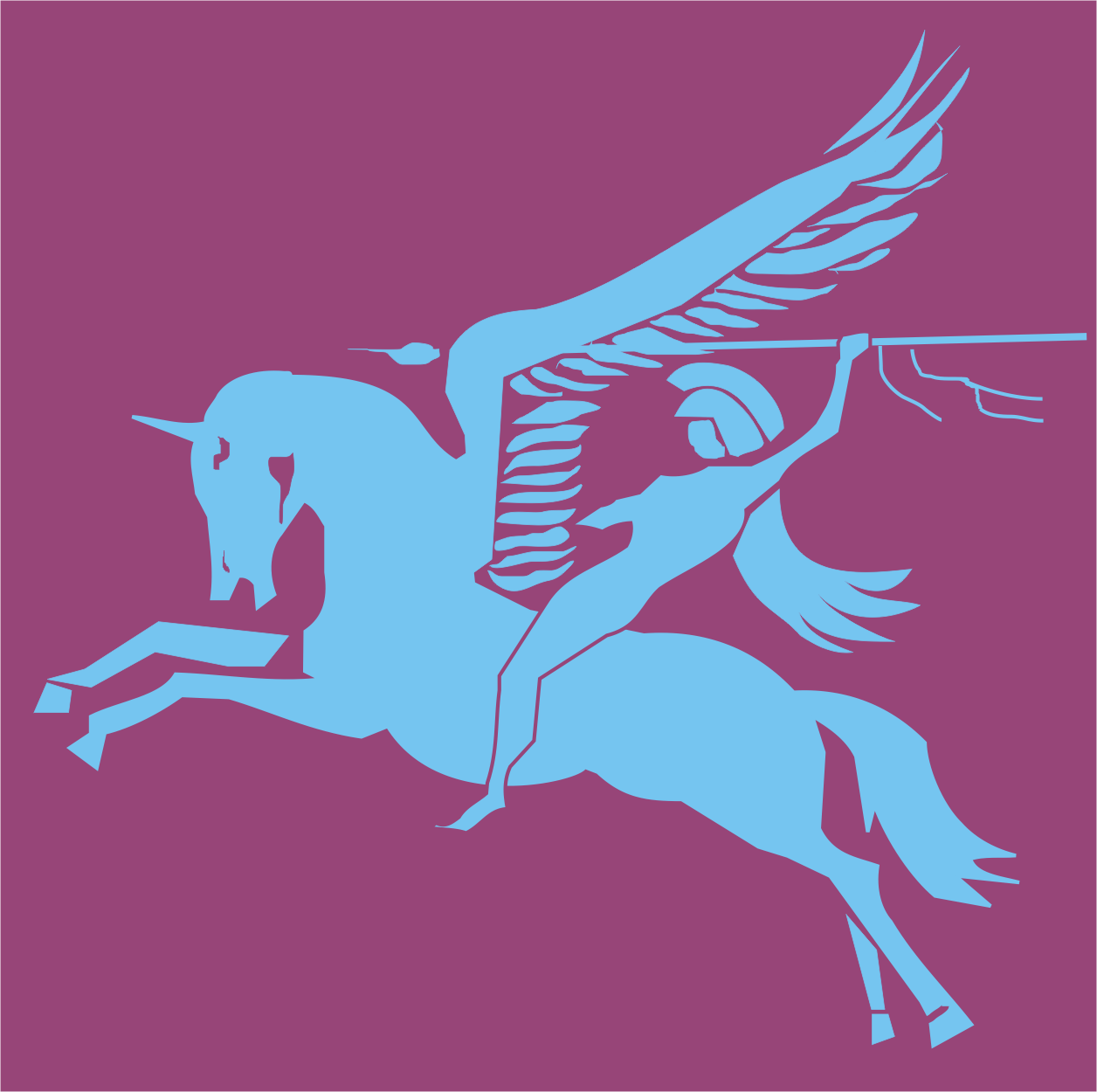
- Emblem of the British Airborne Forces

The 12th (Yorkshire) Parachute Battalion was an airborne infantry battalion of the Parachute Regiment, raised by the British Army during the Second World War. The battalion was formed by the conversion of the 10th (East Riding Yeomanry) Battalion, Green Howards to parachute duties in May 1943. They were then assigned to the 5th Parachute Brigade, alongside the 7th and 13th Parachute battalions, which was part of the 6th Airborne Division.

The battalion took part in Operation Tonga during the D-Day landings, capturing Ranville and held it against several German counter-attacks. It later fought in the Battle of Breville, and played a part in the 6th Airborne Division advance to the River Seine, after which it was returned to England in September 1944. The battalion was deployed to the River Meuse with the 5th Parachute Brigade during the German Ardennes offensive in December. Its final mission in Europe was Operation Varsity, the River Rhine crossing in March 1945. They then advanced further into Germany, and had reached the Baltic Sea, when Germany surrendered.

After the war in Europe the battalion was sent to the Far East, taking part in operations in Malaya and Java. In 1946 the battalion rejoined the 6th Airborne Division in Palestine, where it was disbanded. In 1947 a new 12th Battalion was raised as part of the 16th Airborne Division in the reformed Territorial Army.

== Formation ==
In May 1943, the 10th (East Riding Yeomanry) Battalion, Green Howards was converted to parachute duties becoming the 12th (Yorkshire) Parachute Battalion, under the command of Lieutenant Colonel R.G. Parker. David Dobie, who would later lead the 1st Parachute Battalion at the Battle of Arnhem in September 1944, was the battalion's second-in-command. The battalion was then assigned to the 5th Parachute Brigade, commanded initially by Brigadier Edwin Flavell before Brigadier Nigel Poett succeeded him. The brigade was one of three which was part of Major-General Richard Gale's 6th Airborne Division.

Upon formation, the battalion had an establishment of 556 men in three rifle companies. The companies were divided into a small headquarters and three platoons. The platoons had three Bren machine guns and three 2-inch mortars, one of each per section. The only heavy weapons in the battalion were a 3 inch mortar and a Vickers machine gun platoon. By 1944 a headquarters or support company, was added to the battalion comprising five platoons: motor transport, signals, mortar, machine-gun and anti-tank. With eight 3 inch mortars, four Vickers machine guns and ten PIAT anti-tank projectors.

All members of the battalion had to undergo a twelve-day parachute training course carried out at No. 1 Parachute Training School, RAF Ringway. Initial parachute jumps were from a converted barrage balloon and finished with five parachute jumps from an aircraft. (Note: Barrage balloons were used to speed up training jumps and meet the target of 5,000 trained parachutists.) Anyone failing to complete a descent was returned to his old unit. Those men who successfully completed the parachute course, were presented with their maroon beret and parachute wings.

Airborne soldiers were expected to fight against superior numbers of the enemy, armed with heavy weapons, including artillery and tanks. So training was designed to encourage a spirit of self-discipline, self-reliance and aggressiveness. Emphasis was given to physical fitness, marksmanship and fieldcraft. A large part of the training regime consisted of assault courses and route marching. Military exercises included capturing and holding airborne bridgeheads, road or rail bridges and coastal fortifications. At the end of most exercises, the battalion would march back to their barracks. An ability to cover long distances at speed was expected: airborne platoons were required to cover a distance of 50 miles (80 km) in 24 hours, and battalions 32 miles (51 km). (Note: This ability was demonstrated in April 1945. When the 3rd Parachute Brigade advanced 15 miles (24 km) in twenty-four hours, which included eighteen hours of close-quarters fighting. In the same month the 5th Parachute Brigade marched 50 miles (80 km) in seventy-two hours, during which they also carried out two night time assaults.)

== Operational history ==
=== Normandy ===
On 6 June 1944, the 12th Parachute Battalion, under the command of Lieutenant Colonel Johnny Johnson, landed in Normandy at 00:50. The battalion was first tasked with securing the village of Le Bas de Ranville, despite the battalions' drop being heavily dispersed (only two thirds could be accounted for), the village was secured by 04:00 and the battalion began digging in around the village. The 12th held their ground until relieved by elements of the 3rd British Infantry Division advancing from the beaches. During this time the 12th Parachute Battalion was bombarded with heavy mortar and artillery fire, and repelled two German counter-attacks by the 125th Panzer Grenadier Regiment; the first was defeated after destroying a Tiger tank and taking a number of prisoners, and the second was repulsed with the help of an air-landed anti-tank battery which had recently arrived. The battalion then relieved the Glider-borne infantry of the 2nd Battalion, Ox and Bucks Light Infantry at the River Orne and Caen canal bridges.

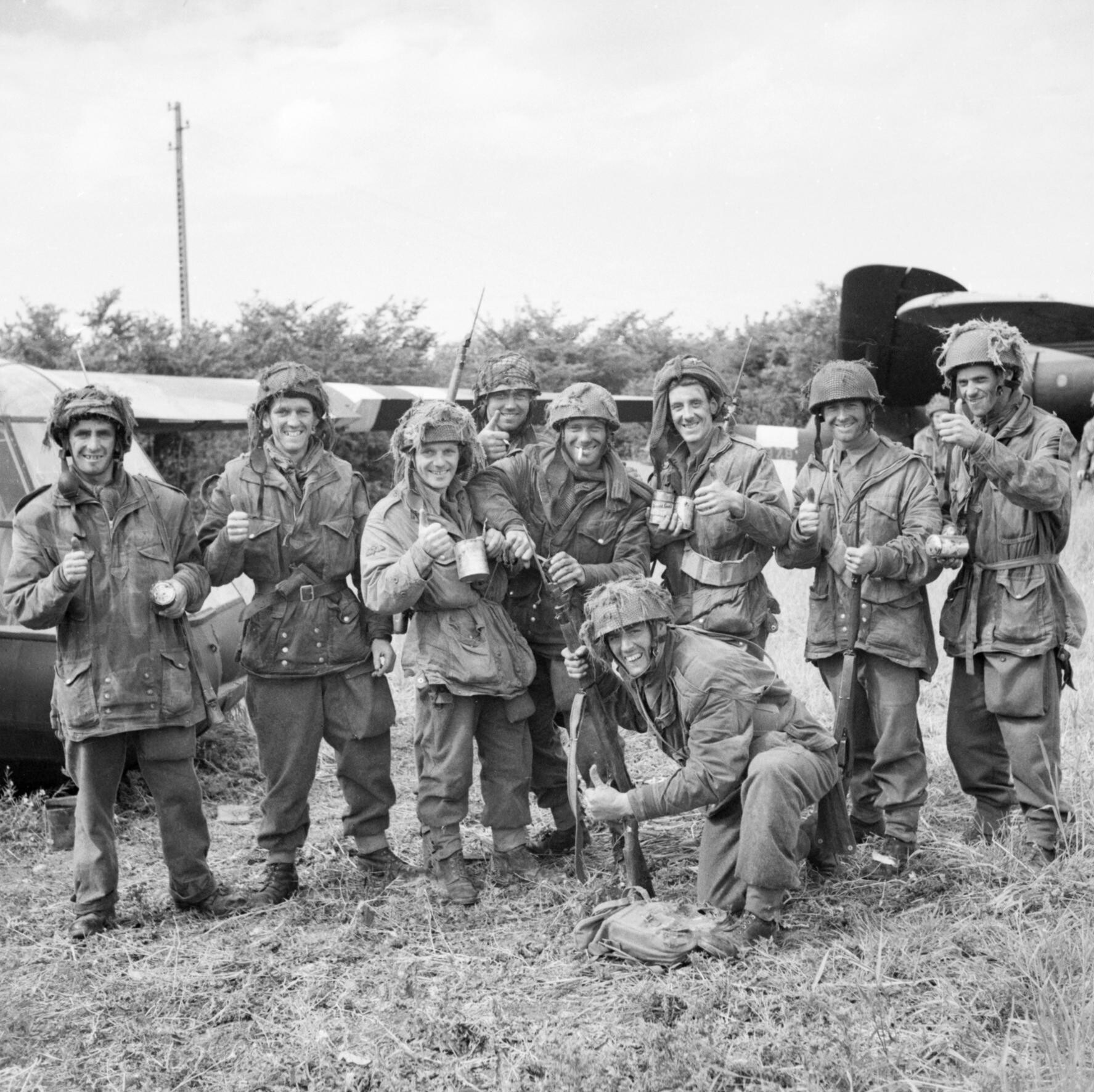
Members of 12th Parachute Battalion enjoy a cup of tea after fighting their way back to Allied lines after three days behind enemy lines, 10 June 1944.

On 7 June the battalion held a defensive line protecting the bridgeheads south of Ranville when they came under attack by eight Panzer IV tanks and an infantry company of the 21st Panzer Division. The attack was beaten off for the loss of three tanks, but caused several casualties amongst 'A' Company, including the crew of their only supporting 6 pounder anti-tank gun. The battalions' commanding officer Lieutenant Colonel Johnson was posthumously awarded the Distinguished Service Order for the action, Private Francis James Hall of the battalion was awarded the Military Medal for destroying two of the Panzers in quick succession.

On 9 June two companies of the battalion were ordered to support the Royal Ulster Rifles in their assault on Honorine la Chardonnerette. The village proved too heavily defended and R.U.R. were order to withdraw. During the withdrawal Lance-Sergeant John Fennell Nankivell of the 12th Battalion Mortar platoon was awarded the Military Medal for continuing to man the battalion Mortar while under heavy sniper fire to cover the withdrawal of the rest of the company.

On 12 June the battalion, now under strength and being held in reserve was ordered to assault the village of Breville with the support of one company from the 12th Battalion Devonshires and the 22nd Independent Parachute Company. The successful capture of the village prevented the German army from using it as a staging area to launch attacks on the River Orne and Caen canal bridgeheads. The Germans never seriously attempted to break through the 6th division's lines again. However the attack cost 12th Parachute Battalion 31 killed (including the battalion's commanding officer, Lieutenant-Colonel Johnson) and around 105 wounded. This left its three rifle companies with only thirty-five men between them.

=== River Seine ===
After a period of rest and reorganisation the battalion rejoined the 5th Parachute Brigade in preparation for the breakout offensive towards the River Seine. On 20 July, the 49th (West Riding) Infantry Division moved into the line between the 6th Airborne Division and the 51st (Highland) Infantry Division. On 7 August the division's commander, Major-General Richard Gale, was ordered to prepare the 6th Airborne to move onto the offensive, they would be advancing on the left flank of the 49th Division, with their objective being the mouth of the River Seine. The three divisions east of the Orne together became I Corps; its commander, Lieutenant-General John Crocker, knowing that the 6th Airborne had almost no artillery, vehicles or engineer equipment, did not expect it to advance very quickly. To reach the Seine, the division would have to cross three major rivers.

On 17 August the 3rd Parachute Brigade led the division's breakout from the start line, by 18 August the brigade had crossed the River Dives and reached the outskirts of Goustranville. Here the division halted, and the 5th Parachute Brigade took over the attack, their first objective being the village of Putot en Auge. The 13th Parachute Battalion attempted to carry out a bayonet assault on Hill 13 however they were forced to withdraw under heavy fire after a German counterattack. The 7th Parachute Battalion secured the area east of Putot en Auge, while the 12th Parachute Battalion assaulted the village itself, taking 120 German prisoners and several heavy weapons.

On 21 August, the 3rd Parachute Brigade advanced towards the River Touques at Pont-l'Évêque facing very heavy resistance from German infantry and armour. Here the brigade held firm while the 5th Parachute Brigade advanced through them, and reached Pont-l'Évêque on 22 August. Both the 12th and 13th battalions attempted to force bridge heads across the Touques river. Under the cover of a smoke barrage, the 12th Battalion attempted to cross at a railway embankment at Saint Jean. The Germans opened fire when they were around 400 yards (370 m) from the river; only ten men from the battalion succeeded in crossing, and then became trapped on the far bank. Running low on ammunition, and without support, they eventually withdrew. Sergeant Dennis Edmund Griss of 'A' Company was awarded the Croix de Guerre for the action. The 13th battalion attempted to cross the first branch of the river but facing fierce German resistance they also withdrew. The next day, patrols from the 7th Parachute Battalion discovered that the Germans had withdrawn during the night, and they therefore crossed the river and secured the high ground to the north, closely followed by the rest of the brigade. On 26 August the 5th Parachute Brigade and the Dutch Motorized Brigade raced to capture Pont Audemer, the crossing over the River Seine, but the Germans were able to destroy the bridge just 20 minutes before their arrival. Despite being "quite inadequately equipped for a rapid pursuit", in nine days of fighting the 6th Airborne Division had advanced 45 miles (72 km) and captured 400 square miles (1,000 km2) of enemy held territory. The division was soon withdrawn from the fighting and returned to the United Kingdom.

=== Ardennes ===
The 6th Airborne Division was called to intervene in the German offensive through the Ardennes on 20 December 1944. On the 29th of that month they attacked the tip of the German thrust and the 5th Parachute Brigade was ordered towards Grupont. The battalion, now commanded by Lieutenant Colonel Kenneth Darling, was involved for several months of heavy patrolling, in Belgium and, in February, the Netherlands opposed to the 7th Parachute Division (Fallschirmjäger), the 6th Airborne Division was then withdrawn to England.

=== Germany ===
By March 1945 the 12th Parachute Battalion had returned to England for reorganisation and training. The battalion was next participating in the Rhine crossing, Operation Varsity. At 10:14 on 24 March the battalion dropped west of Hamminkeln, north west of Wesel, amidst considerable 88mm fire.

The drop had left the battalion dispersed and disorientated, they first assembled at a similar but incorrect rendezvous. Upon realising their mistake and proceeding to the correct area, they suffered casualties after coming under fire from German troops dug in along the drop area. The battalion located the German positions, countered them and took several prisoners. The 12th and 13th battalions then made their way off the drop zone and, after a struggle, established themselves on the Brigade's main objective, covering the road to Hamminkeln.

On 26 March the battalion advanced through Hamminkeln where HQ was established. 'A' Company of the 12th also took 40 POWs who surrendered without resistance.

During the night of 28 March, 13th Parachute Battalion captured the high ground above the village of Erle. Simultaneously 12th Battalion marched 20 miles (32 km) across country, and were ready to assault Erle once daylight came. The battalion then assaulted at dawn capturing the village after an hour's fight and taking 100-200 POWs.

On 6 April advancing in the direction of the River Leine, the 12th Parachute Battalion maintained an advance for 30 hours, including 30 miles in 10 hours, and as a result of four major skirmishes, had killed or captured three hundred enemy troops and a considerable amount of war materiel. Following this advance they were furthest troops into Germany of any in British 2nd Army.

The 5th Parachute Brigade continued its advance through Germany towards the Baltic sea, often supported by tanks of the 6th Guards Tank Brigade.

=== Far East ===
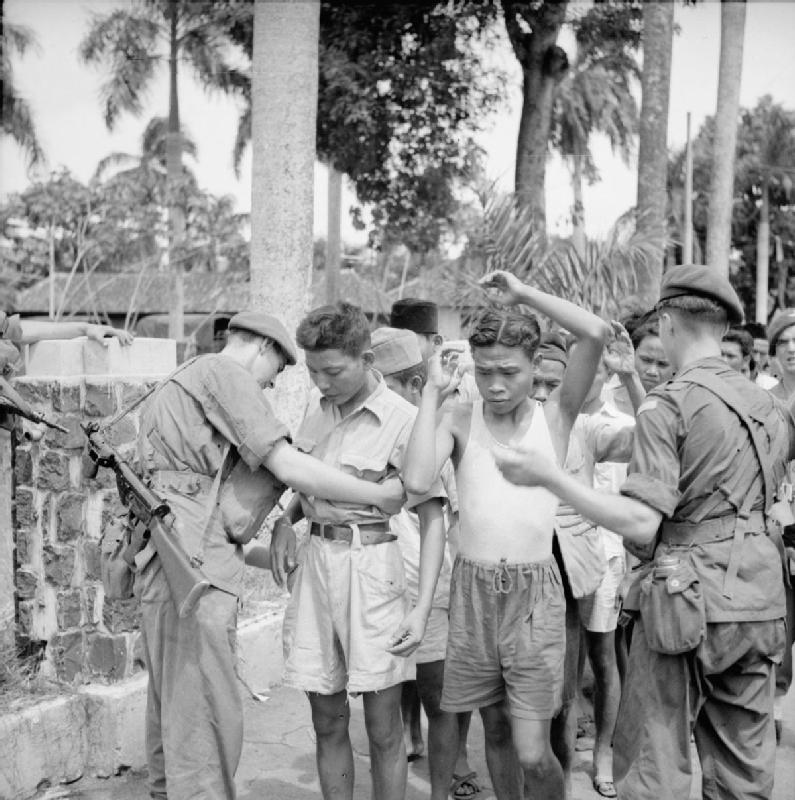
Men of the 12th Battalion, Parachute Regiment search suspects in Batavia during the operation to take control of all civil administration buildings in the city.

Following the war in Europe the battalion deployed with the 5th Brigade to Far East. The end of the war precluded any combat operations against Japanese forces. The brigade took part in the unopposed liberation of Malaya and Singapore. The battalion was then deployed to Malaya under the command of the 23rd Indian Infantry Division. In December 1945 the 23rd Indian Division and 5th Parachute Brigade successfully occupied civil administration buildings in Batavia, including all police stations. Many public officials were suspected of collaboration with the nationalist insurgents and were quickly interrogated and dismissed from the force.

=== Palestine ===
In 1946 the 5th Brigade was sent to join the 6th Airborne Division in Palestine, upon arrival in August news was received the 5th Parachute Brigade would be disbanded. Members of the 12th Parachute Battalion were distributed among other parachute units of the division.

=== Territorial Army ===
When the Territorial Army was reformed after the war, a new 12th Battalion, Parachute Regiment (TA) was formed in 1947. The battalion was re-designated 12 PARA (TA) in 1948, and again became part of the 5th Parachute Brigade, attached to 16th Airborne Division (TA). In October 1956, the 12th Battalion was amalgamated with the 13th Battalion as the 12/13 PARA (TA). A further amalgamation with 17 PARA in 1967, formed the present day 4th Battalion, Parachute Regiment.

== Notes ==
Footnotes

Citations
