= Bavent =

- Commune
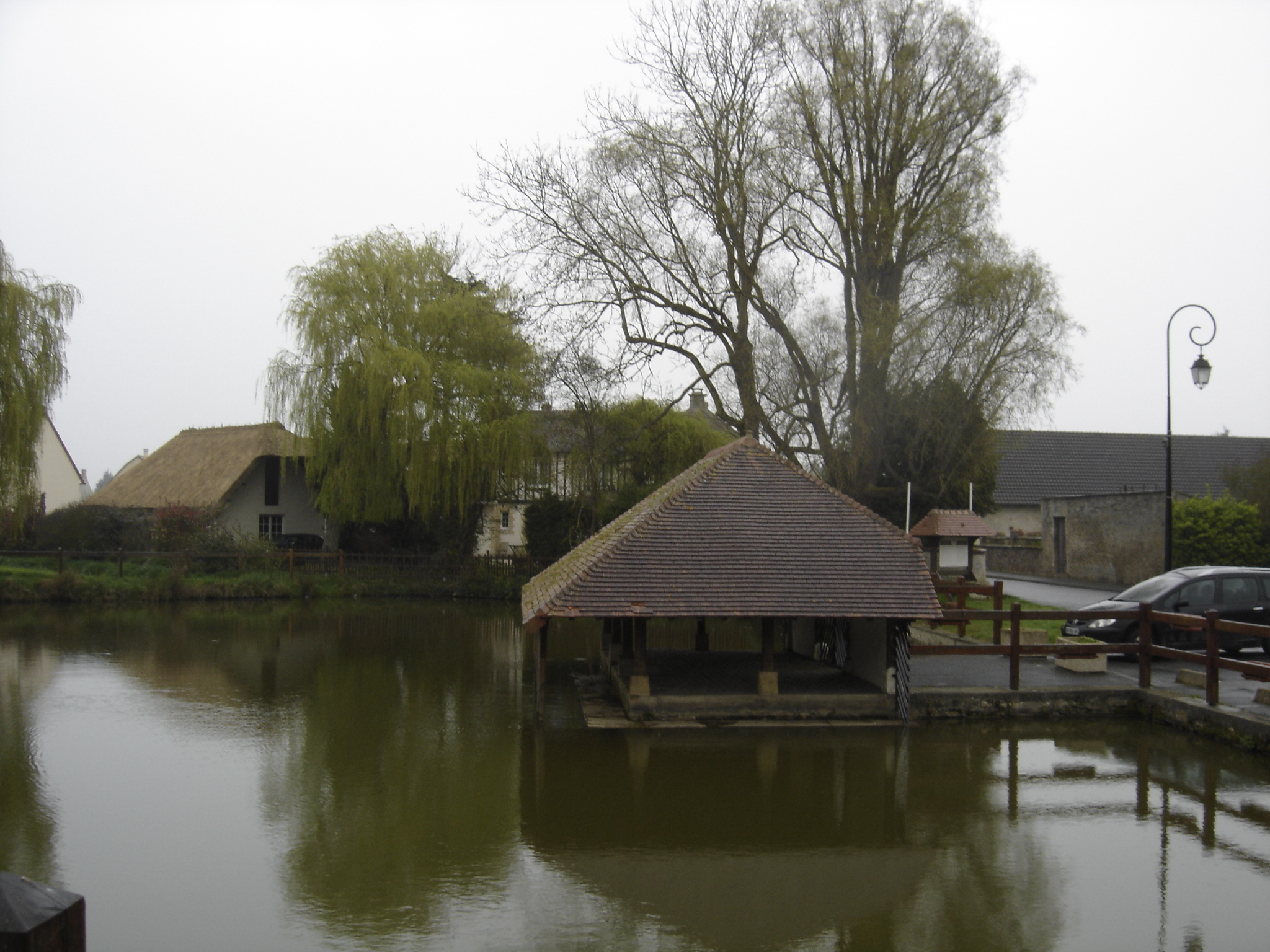
- The Lavoir

- Coat of arms
- Location of Bavent
- Location within France Location within Normandy
- Coordinates: 49°13′54″N 0°11′05″W
- Country: France
- Region: Normandy
- Department: Calvados
- Arrondissement: Lisieux
- Canton: Cabourg
- Intercommunality: CC Normandie-Cabourg-Pays d'Auge

Government
  - Mayor (2020–2026): Jean-Luc Garnier
- Area^{1}: 18.45 km^{2} (7.12 sq mi)
- Elevation: 40 m (130 ft)
- Highest elevation: 66 m (217 ft)
- Lowest elevation: 2 m (6.6 ft)
- Population (2023): 1,885
  - Density: 102.2/km^{2} (264.6/sq mi)
- Time zone: UTC+01:00 (CET)
  - Summer (DST): UTC+02:00 (CEST)
- INSEE/Postal code: 14046 /14860
- ^{1} French Land Register data, which excludes lakes, ponds, glaciers > 1 km^{2} (0.386 sq mi or 247 acres) and river estuaries.

Bavent (French pronunciation: [bavɑ̃]) is a commune in the Calvados department in the Normandy region of north-western France.

The inhabitants of the commune are known as Baventais or Baventaises.

== Geography ==
Bavent is located on the northern edge of the Caen plain some 8 km north-east of Caen and 6 km south-west of Cabourg. Access to the commune is by the D513 road from Varaville in the north-east which passes through the commune just north of the village and continues south-west to Hérouvillette. Access to the village is by the D236 which comes from Amfreville in the north-west. The D224 branches from the D513 in the commune and goes west to the village and continues to Goustranville. The D95A goes north from the village to Gonneville-en-Auge while the D95 goes south to Troarn. The D37B branches from the D513 in the west of the commune and goes north to Bréville-les-Monts. Apart from the village there are the hamlets of Chateau de Beneauville, Chef-de-Rue, Les Harnots, Grand Plain, La Ritachere, Le Prieure, La Petite Bruyere, Roncheville, and Robehomme. The commune is mostly farmland except for a large forest, the Bois de Bavent, in the south. and a marsh, the Marais de Bavent, to the east.

At 1845 hectares, the commune is the largest in the canton of Cabourg. Its highest point (66 m) is located in the west near a place called La Grande Bruyère. Its lowest point (2 m) is at the exit of the Dives from the commune.

Due to its proximity to the sea, Bavent enjoys an oceanic climate. The nearest weather station is 19 km away at Caen-Carpiquet.

The river Dives forms the south-eastern border of the commune as it flows north-east to join the ocean at Houlgate. The Divette rises in the commune and flows north to join the Dives. The Douet du Moulin du Pre rises in the commune and flows north-east to join the Divette north of Varaville. The Saint-Laurent stream flows from the south through the commune and continues to join the Divette just north of the commune. The Ruisseau du Bois de Bavent forms part of the southern border of the commune.

== Toponymy ==
Bavent is attested in the forms: Bavent in 1059, Badvento in 1063, and Batvent in 1066.

The origin of this place name divides Toponymists:

- Dauzat and Rostaing suggest bat vent meaning "a place where the wind blows"
- René Lepelley makes a similar hypothesis: that of an old mill whose "sails are blown by the wind". There is fact a mill at Sénoville (Manche), called La Masse de Bavent.
- Ernest Nègre proposes an explanation of Bavent from a German anthroponym Badvin.

It is also possible to suggest the Celtic name -ent- Latinized to -entu (m) which is also found in Douvrend (Dovrent in the 12th century) preceded by an unknown element in the absence of an older form. The same suffix has been identified in Nogent (Novientum, from novio meaning "new") and Drevant (Derventum from Dervo meaning "oak", cf. Breton derv also meaning "oak").

The name is homophonic with Bavans (Bavens 11th century, the name of a German man Bavo with the Germanic suffix -ingen Romanized to -ingos).

Robehomme is attested in the forms: Raimberti Hulmus in 1083, Rambertihulmus in 1149, and Robbehomme in 1190.

The first element Robe- comes from the German anthroponym Raimbert. The second element -hommen is widespread in Normandy in this form with the hiatus (the "h" is aspirated): Le Homme (not l'homme cf. Saint-Quentin-sur-le-Homme). This is a toponymic appellative derived from Old Norse holmr meaning "island" or "meadow at the edge of the water". It also took the forms Houlme and Hom. Moreover, there is a hamlet of Hom at Robehomme.

There is also a personal name associated with a Norse appellative topt giving -tot as in Raimbertot at Cauville-sur-Mer (Seine-Maritime).

Bavent appears as Bavent on the 1750 Cassini Map and as Baven on the 1790 version.

Robehomme appears as Robehomme on the 1750 Cassini Map and as Robe homme on the 1790 version.

== History ==
In 1974 the commune of Bavent (984 inhabitants in 1968) merged with Robehomme (122 inhabitants in 1954).

=== Heraldry ===
Arms of Bavent	The municipal council has modified the old coat of arms and made a logo which can no longer be defined with a blazon. (Note: The new emblem can be seen on the commune website by clicking here.) The ancient arms of the commune are blazoned as follows: (Note: These arms do not respect the Rule of tincture and are therefore faulty.) Blazon: Argent, a bendlet Gules charged with 4 Bavent pottery pieces of Or (a pot with 2 handles, a jug, a vase, and a flared collar pot) in bend between: in chief 3 jonquil flowers the same* set in orle, in base a heron contourned the same beaked and legged in Sable; in chief Or charged with an inscription in capitals BAVENT, at sinister Gules two lions passant guardant of Or one over the other.

== Administration ==
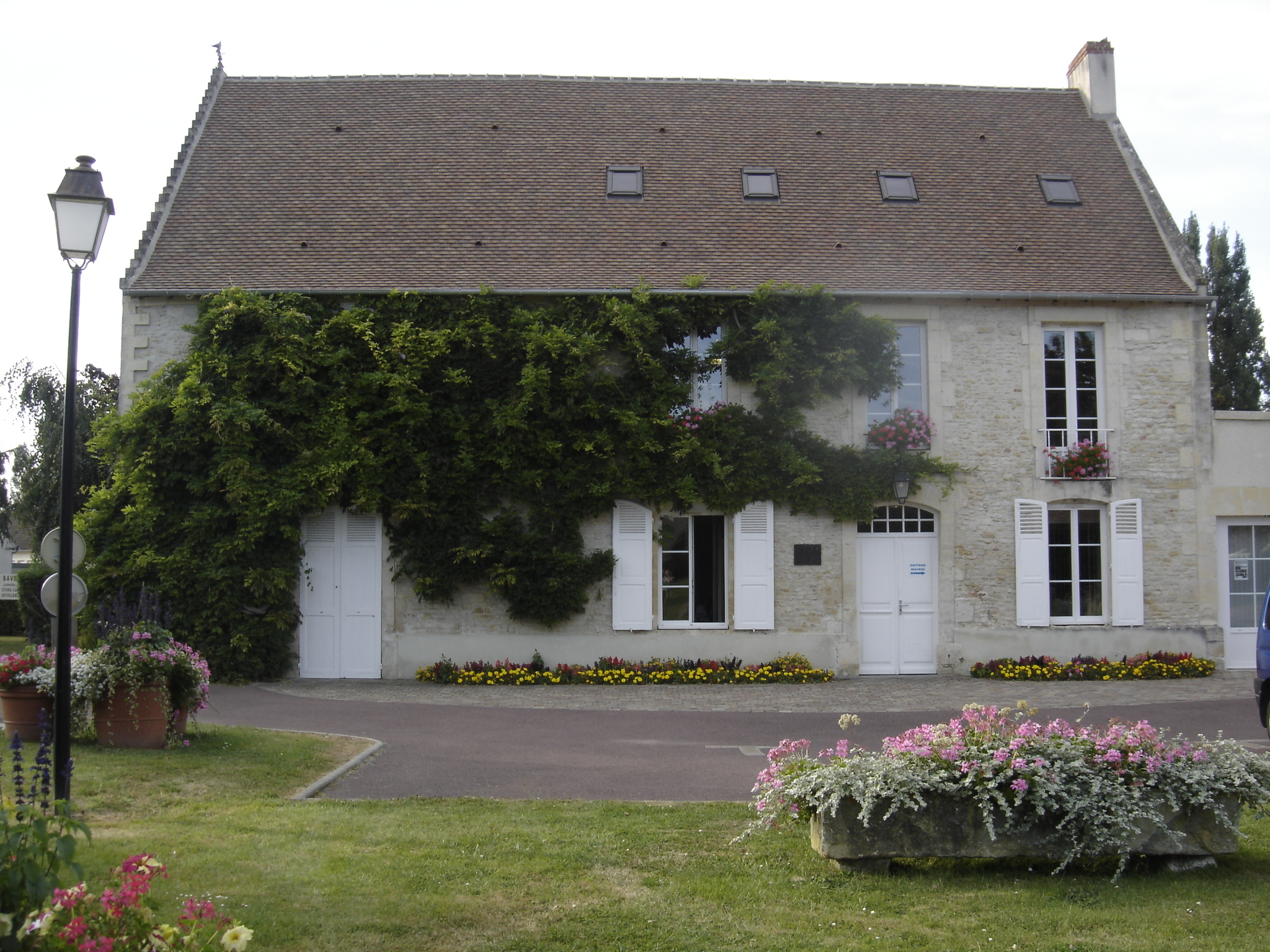
Bavent Town Hall

List of Successive Mayors

From	To	Name	Party	Position
1956	1982	André Yvonnet		Doctor
1983	2008	Joël Leroy		Professor
2008	2026	Jean-Luc Garnier		Administrative Officer

=== Twinning ===
Bavent has twinning associations with:

- Geiselbach (Germany) since 1988.
- Stoke Canon (United Kingdom) since 1983.

== Demography ==
Historical population

Year	Pop.	±% p.a.
1793	827	—
1800	778	−0.87%
1806	846	+1.41%
1821	941	+0.71%
1831	968	+0.28%
1841	870	−1.06%
1846	880	+0.23%
1851	907	+0.61%
1856	890	−0.38%
1861	912	+0.49%
1866	871	−0.92%
1872	817	−1.06%
1876	812	−0.15%
1881	791	−0.52%
1886	739	−1.35%
1891	727	−0.33%
1896	675	−1.47%
1901	675	+0.00%

Year	Pop.	±% p.a.
1906	669	−0.18%
1911	638	−0.94%
1921	597	−0.66%
1926	641	+1.43%
1931	660	+0.59%
1936	686	+0.78%
1946	547	−2.24%
1954	741	+3.87%
1962	905	+2.53%
1968	984	+1.40%
1975	993	+0.13%
1982	914	−1.18%
1990	1,606	+7.30%
1999	1,723	+0.78%
2007	1,738	+0.11%
2012	1,731	−0.08%
2017	1,814	+0.94%
2023	1,885	+0.64%

Source: EHESS and INSEE

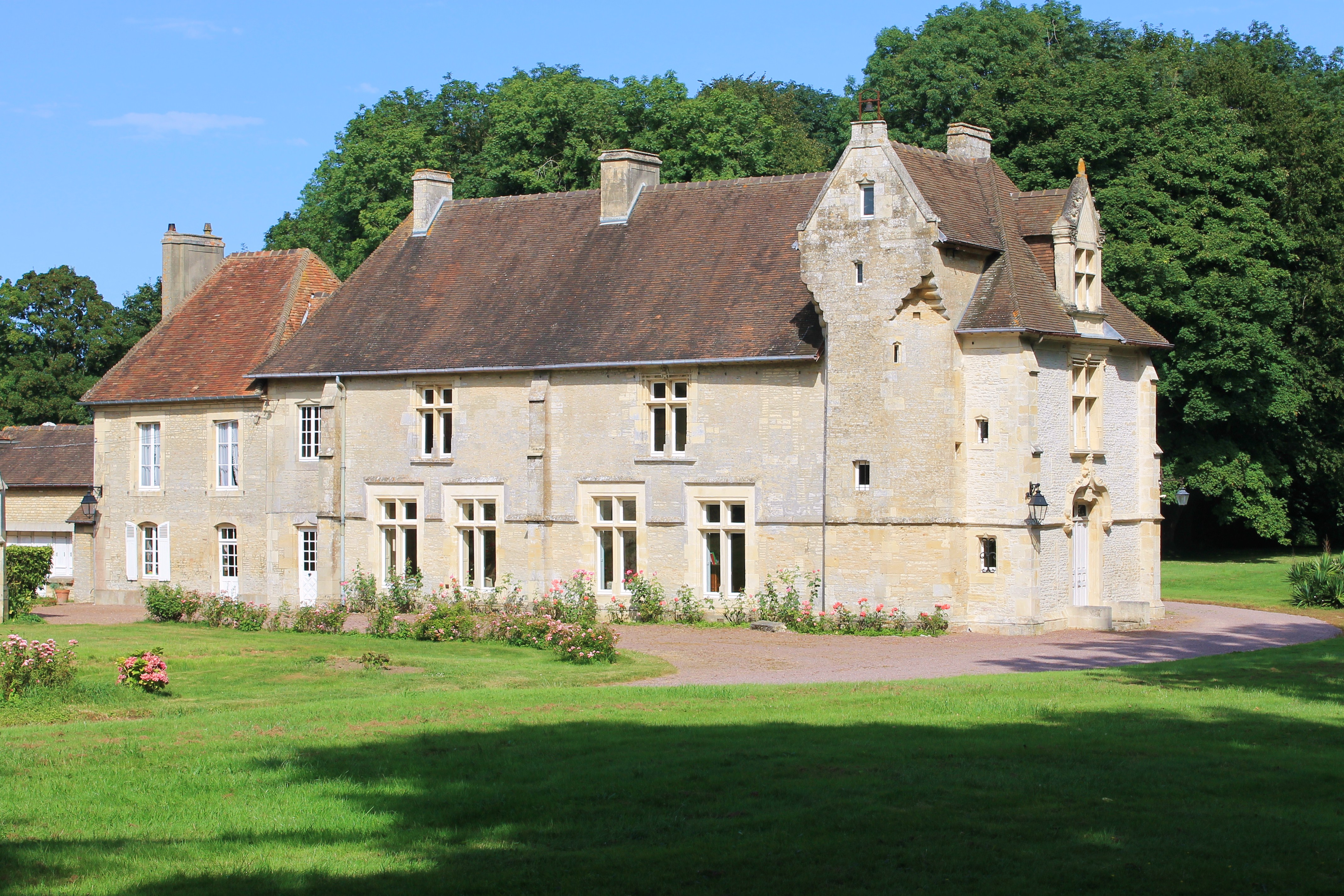
The Manoir Venoix

== Economy ==
The Terreal Group has a tile production plant in the commune.

The Mesnil pottery of Bavent manufactures finials of Faience. It holds an Enterprise label of living heritage and its expertise is included in the inventory of intangible cultural heritage in France.

== Culture and heritage ==
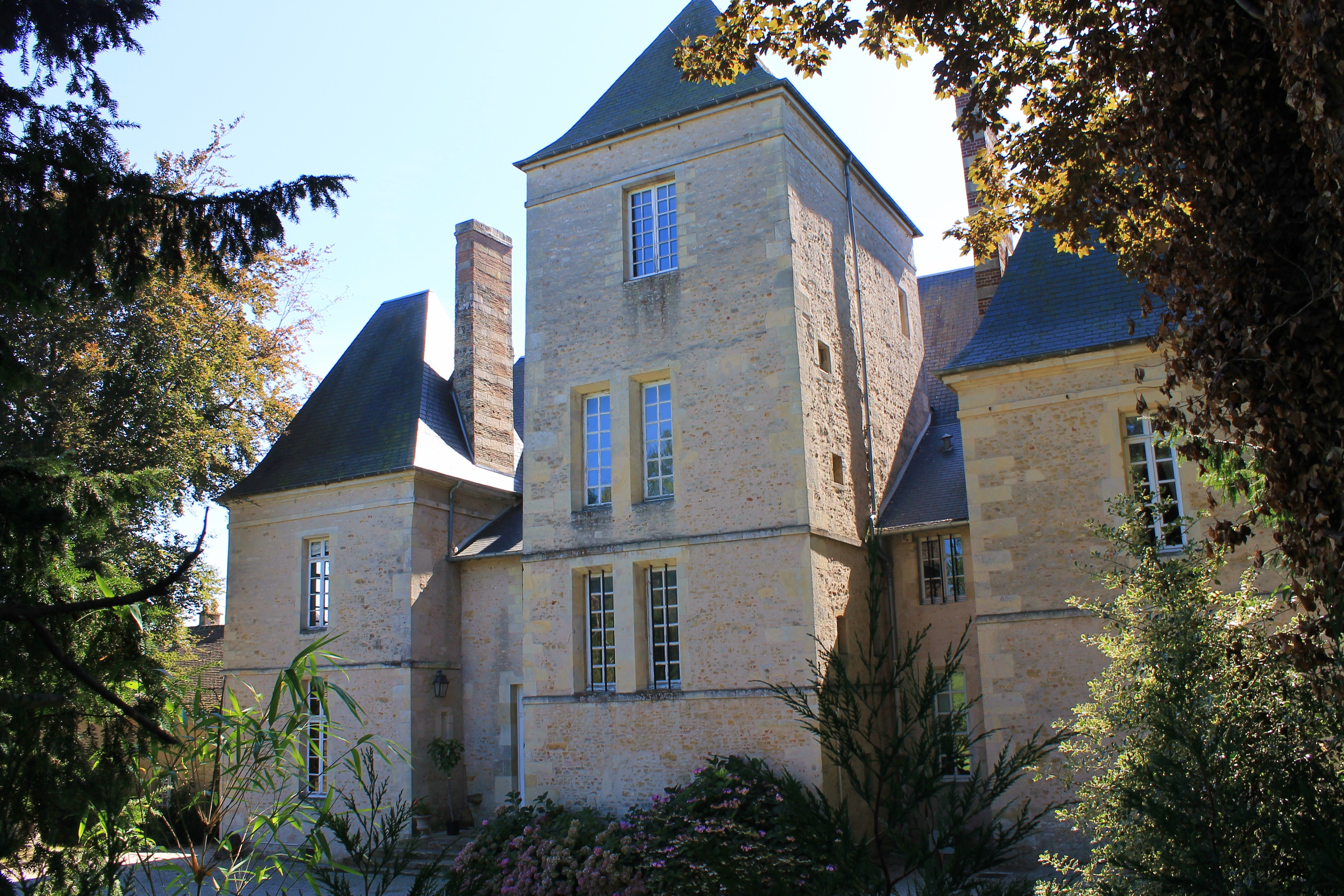
The Chateau of Bavent

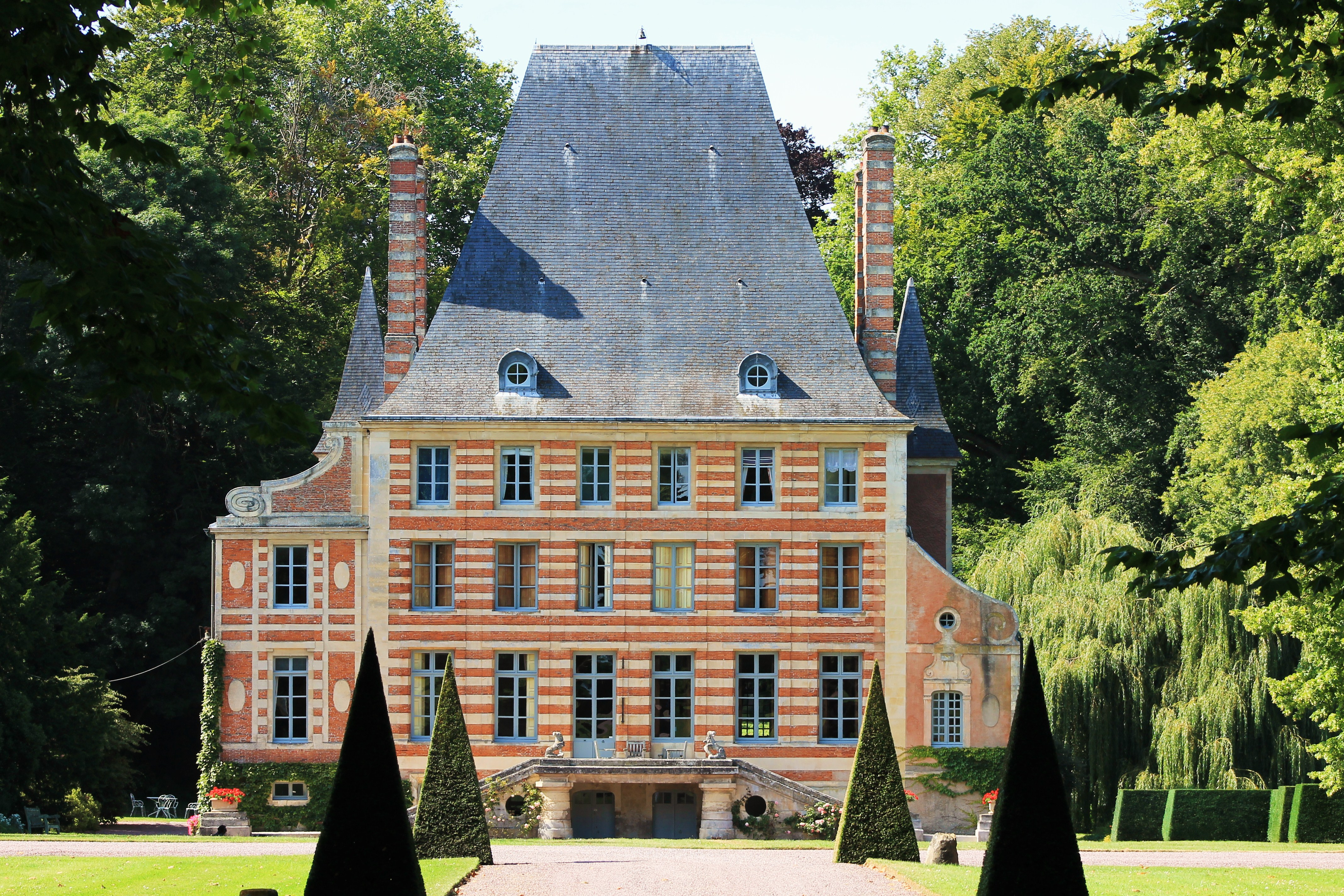
The Chateau of Béneauville

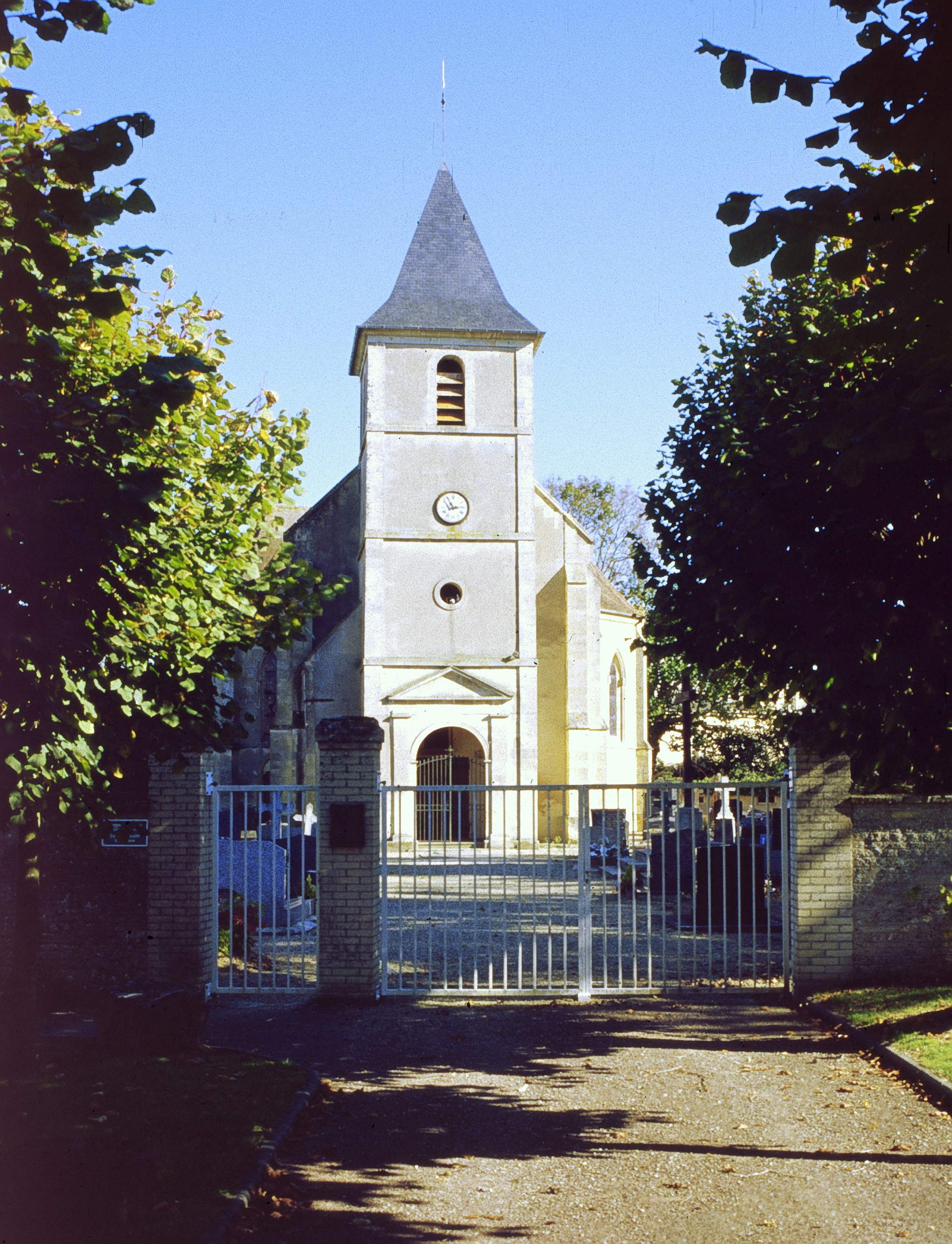
Saint Hilaire Church

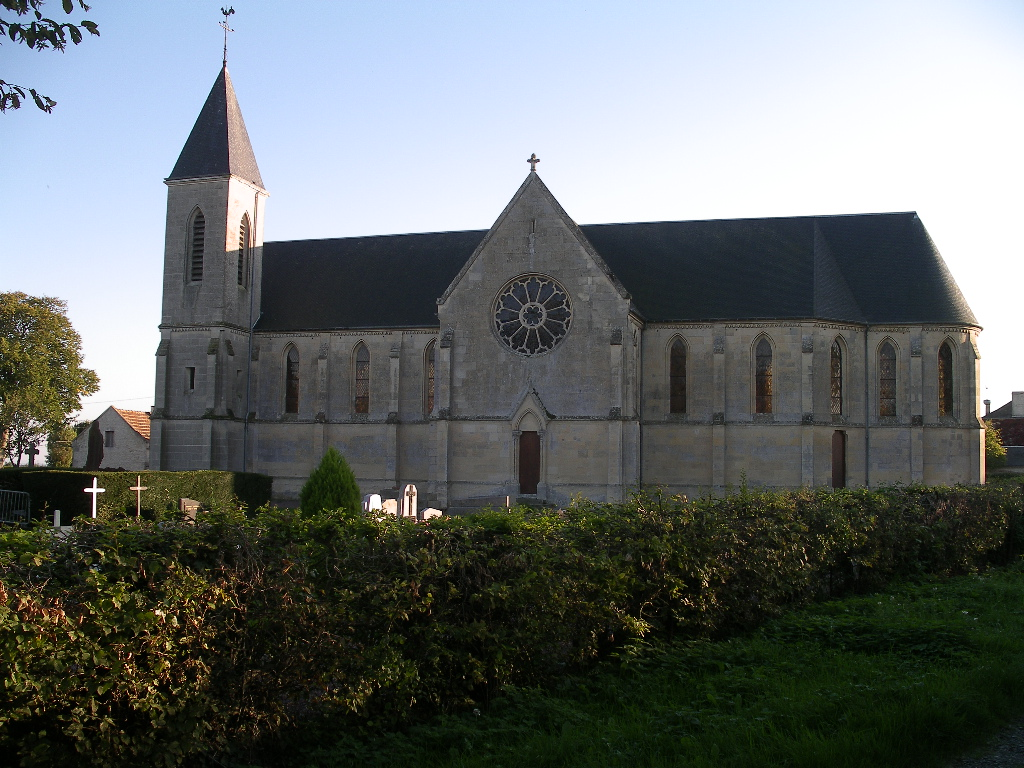
The Robehomme Church

=== Civil heritage ===
- The Manoir Venoix (17th century). In 1944 the mansion had significant damage and was renovated in 1948 with some additions and changes.
- The Pavilion of Pottery (1842).

The commune has a number of buildings and sites that are registered as historical monuments:

- The Chateau of Bavent (17th century)
- The Château of Béneauville (1589)
- The Château of Béneauville Park The Chateau contains a Clock (16th century) which is registered as an historical object.

=== Religious heritage ===
- The Church of Saint Hilaire (12th century, much altered in the 19th century).
- The Church at Robehomme

== Sports ==
- The Bavent Football Club has a soccer team in the district division.

== Notable people linked to the commune ==
- Henri-Gabriel-Marie Le Bègue de Germiny (1811-1900), politician, Mayor of Bavent

== See also ==
- Communes of the Calvados department
