= Royal Netherlands Motorized Infantry Brigade =

Princess Irene Brigade
- Koninklijke Nederlandse Brigade ‘Prinses Irene’
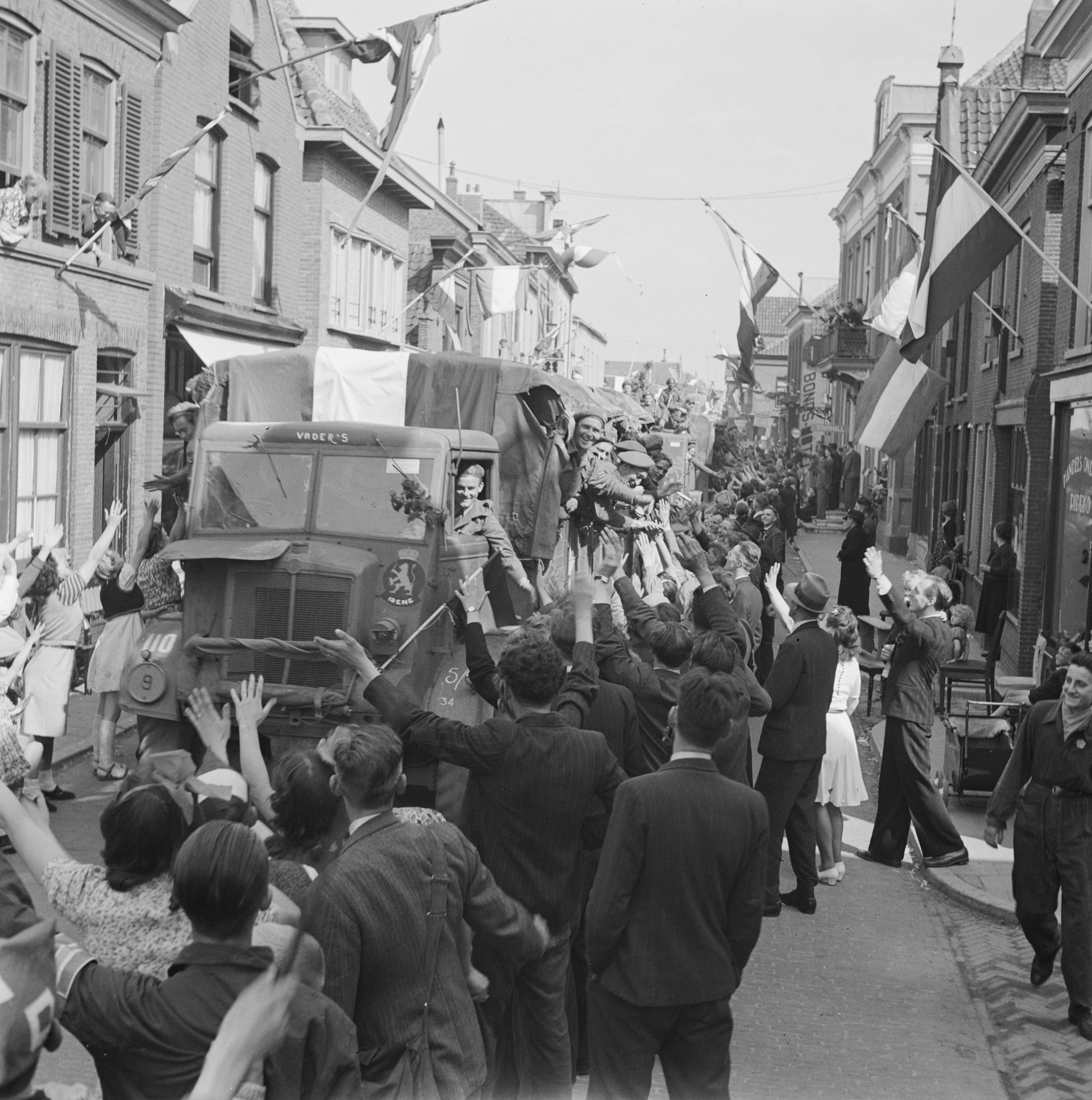
- Princess Irene Brigade in South Holland on 8 May 1945
- Active: May 1940-May 1945
- Disbanded: Disbanded May 1945 to make way for a regiment.
- Country: Netherlands
- Allegiance: Dutch government-in-exile
- Branch: Royal Netherlands Army
- Type: Infantry brigade
- Role: Mechanized infantry
- Size: 1,800-~2,000
- Patron: Princess Irene
- Engagements: World War II: Battle of Normandy; Operation Market Garden; Operation Pheasant

Commanders
- Major: Sas (May 1940-Jan. 1941)
- Major: Phaff (Jan. 1941-)
- N/A: Various
- Colonel: A. C. de Ruyter van Steveninck (by Aug. 1944)

During the Second World War, the Royal Netherlands Motorized Infantry Brigade, later known as the Princess Irene Brigade (Dutch: Prinses Irene Brigade) was a Dutch military unit initially formed from approximately 1,500 troops, including a small group guarding German prisoners-of-war, who arrived in the United Kingdom in May 1940 following the collapse of the Netherlands. Elements of this force became the nucleus of what was originally called the "Dutch Legion."

Veterans of the Princess Irene Brigade who were members of the Dutch Army stationed at Wrottesley Park, Wolverhampton during World War II were given the Freedom of the City of Wolverhampton on 19 August 2006.

== History ==
=== Formation ===
Although augmented by conscription of overseas citizens from Canada, the United States, the Middle East, the Dutch West Indies (Netherlands Antilles and Suriname), South Africa and Argentina; the Dutch force grew very slowly as troops were detached for other duties i.e. the Commandos, the Navy etc. The unit never totalled more than about 2,000 men at one time with a total of around 3,000 serving, less than the 3,000 to 4,000 personnel normally associated with a brigade.

While some 500 Surinamese volunteered for service in the brigade, they were rejected by the Dutch government, on the grounds that their racial background might cause offense to volunteers and conscripts from South Africa. Despite this some Surinamese did serve in the Brigade and fight during WW2. Some Dutch West Indian personnel nevertheless later saw action with the Royal Netherlands East Indies Army in the Pacific theatre.

The brigade would be trained first in Guelph, then Stratford, Ontario alongside British units.

On 11 February 1941, by approval of Queen Wilhelmina, the Dutch Legion gained a new name, the Prinses Irene Brigade (P.I.B.).

The Prinses Irene Brigade was formed in Congleton, Cheshire.

=== Operation Overlord ===
On 6 August 1944, the first troops of the P.I.B landed at Graye-sur-Mer Normandy, in northern France. Later, the main force landed and the P.I.B. served under the First Canadian Army until it moved forward with the British Second Army. Heavy fighting took place around the Chateau St Come ("Hellfire Corner") before the brigade advanced to the Seine, liberating Pont Audemer in the process.

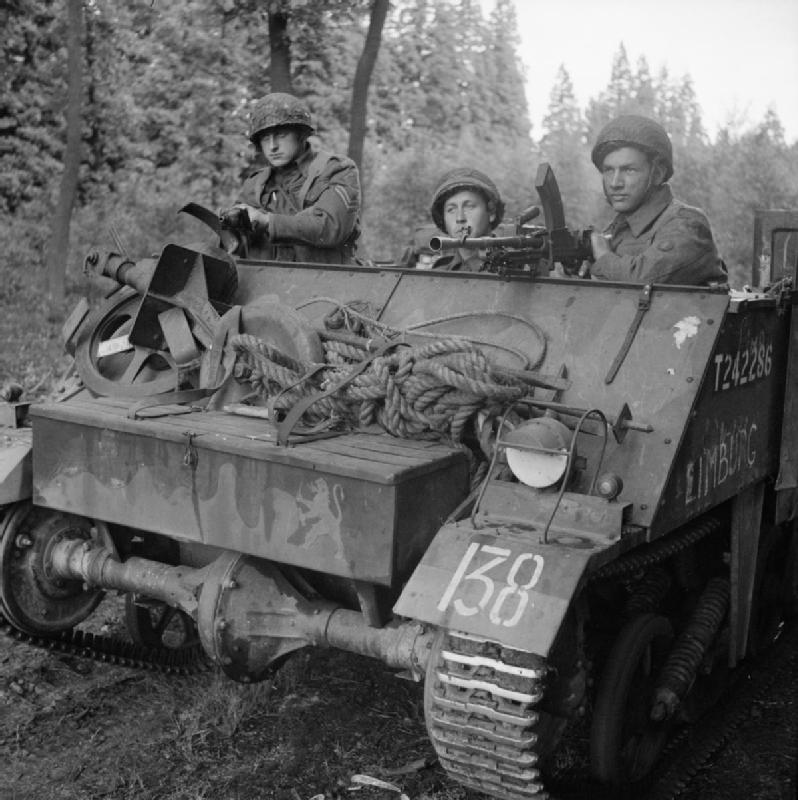
A Loyd Carrier of the Prinses Irene Brigade, in September 1944.

In mid-September, the P.I.B. became involved in fighting with German forces at the town of Beringen.

=== Operation Market Garden ===
It first re-entered Dutch territory at Borkel en Schaft on 20 September 1944, as part of Operation Market Garden — the operation to simultaneously capture nine bridges between the Bocholt-Herentals Canal and the Rhine (at Arnhem). At around this time, the brigade was also involved in combat against the Dutch Waffen-SS volunteer formation Landstorm Nederland, German SS, and paratroopers. From 26 September, the P.I.B guarded the then unnamed bridge spanning the River Maas at Grave. (The bridge known later as John S. Thompsonbrug, was the longest to attack and defend during the operation.)

On 24 October, the brigade was ordered to move south-west to Tilburg to attack the town from the south during Operation Pheasant while the 51st (Highland) Infantry Division attacked from the east. The P.I.B. was unable to get to Tilburg and was stranded at Broekhoven, where fighting took place and four soldiers were killed.

The Prinses Irene Brigade spent the winter of 1944/45 in the region of Walcheren and Noord-Beveland (Zeeland), losing several soldiers. From Zeeland, the P.I.B. went back to North Brabant.

On 31 March 1945, the commander of the P.I.B., Colonel De Ruyter van Steveninck, said goodbye to the three platoons of Marines; these subsequently formed II Independent Company and were sent to the US to join the Royal Netherlands Marines Brigade, who had originally assigned these troops to the P.I.B. so the brigade would have enough troops participating in the liberation of Europe, as requested by the British government. The gap left by the Dutch Marines was filled with replacements from the volunteers from the liberated parts of the Netherlands, who had been trained at Bergen Op Zoom under the command of Frank Looringh van Beeck, a South African officer.

On 2 March 1945, the P.I.B. was put under the command of the Netherlands District, under Major General A Galloway, based at the HQ in the city of Tilburg.

=== Operation "Orange" ===
The P.I.B. was involved in heavy fighting in the town of Hedel, north of Den Bosch, on the River Maas in April 1945. The P.I.B. was supposed to link up with the 30 Royal Marines, of the 116th Infantry Brigade Royal Marines, at Kerkdriel in an attempt to liberate the Bommelerwaard. However, the Royal Marines gave up due to German opposition in the town of Kerkdriel, leaving the P.I.B. stranded at the bridgehead of Hedel. The Prinses Irene Brigade was under command of the 116th Infantry Brigade Royal Marines at this time. Still, they fought the Germans with great gallantry, and were able to hold the town for three days. In these fights, the P.I.B. lost twelve men; around thirty were wounded. Several gallantry medals were later awarded for actions in Hedel. At 11:15 hours on 25 April the order to withdraw from the bridgehead, in Hedel, came from 116th Infantry Brigade Royal Marines. At 23:30 hours III Independent Company withdrew from the town as the last unit to the south side of the river Maas. This effort was completed at 00:30 hours on 26 April.

The Princess Irene Brigade entered The Hague on 9 May 1945 as liberators. After the war, the traditions of the brigade were perpetuated by the Garderegiment Fuseliers Prinses Irene.

== Notable members ==
- Max Geldray (1916–2004), jazz musician, wounded in Normandy.

== Order of battle (1944) ==
- I Motorized Independent Infantry Company
- II Motorized Independent Infantry Company
- III Motorized Independent Infantry Company
- Reconnaissance Company (Disbanded 31 March 1945)
- One Artillery Battery (six 25 pounders)
- Brigade Signals
- Brigade Maintenance
