= Foulbec =

- Commune
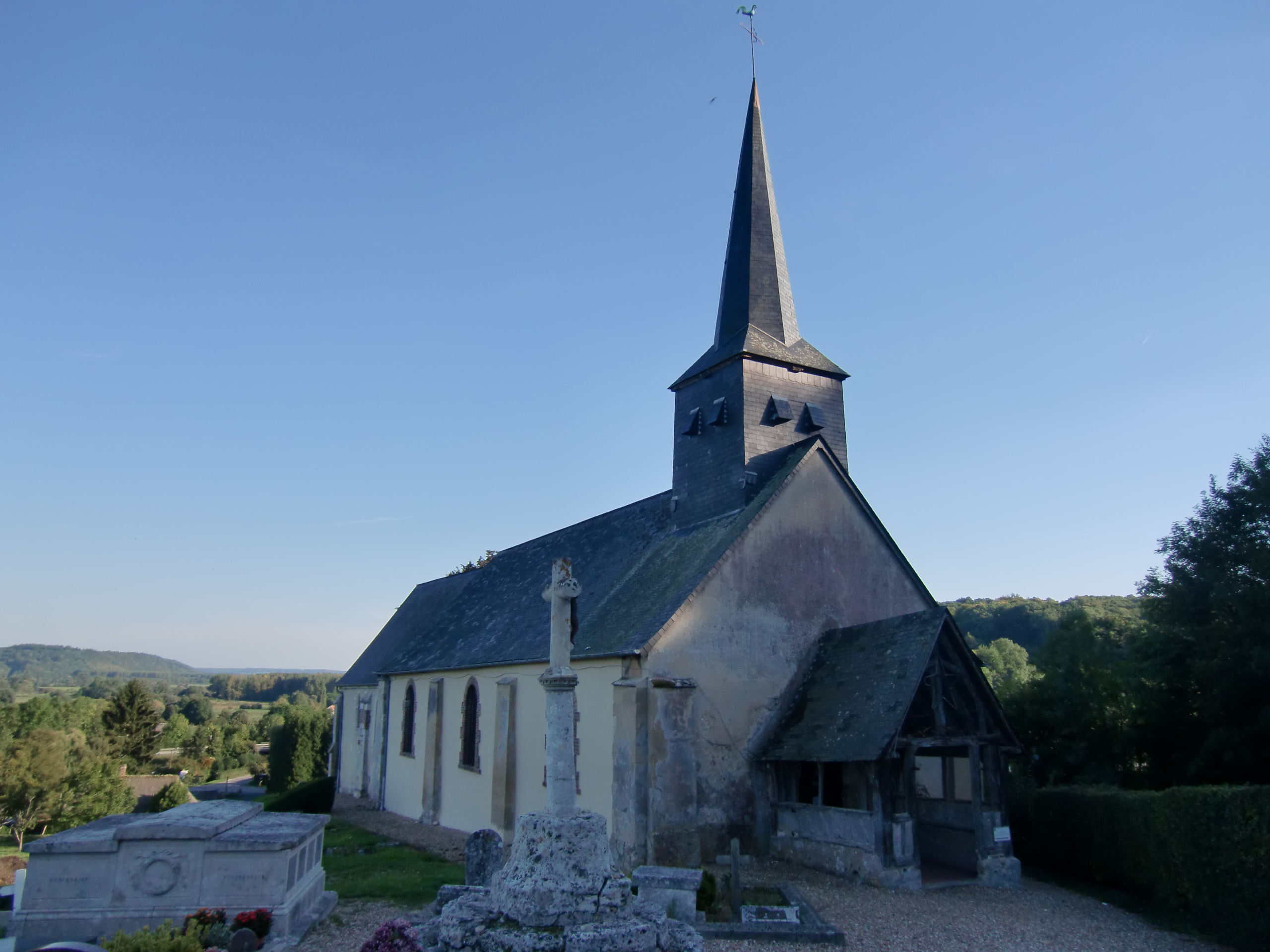
- The church in Foulbec

- Coat of arms
- Location of Foulbec
- Location within France Location within Normandy
- Coordinates: 49°24′02″N 0°25′33″E
- Country: France
- Region: Normandy
- Department: Eure
- Arrondissement: Bernay
- Canton: Beuzeville

Government
  - Mayor (2020–2026): Alain Fontaine
- Area^{1}: 11.86 km^{2} (4.58 sq mi)
- Elevation: 80 m (260 ft)
- Highest elevation: 116 m (381 ft)
- Lowest elevation: 1 m (3.3 ft)
- Population (2023): 642
  - Density: 54.1/km^{2} (140/sq mi)
- Time zone: UTC+01:00 (CET)
  - Summer (DST): UTC+02:00 (CEST)
- INSEE/Postal code: 27260 /27210
- ^{1} French Land Register data, which excludes lakes, ponds, glaciers > 1 km^{2} (0.386 sq mi or 247 acres) and river estuaries.

Foulbec (French pronunciation: [fulbɛk]) is a commune in the Eure department in the Normandy region in northern France.

== Population ==
Historical population
Year	Pop.	±% p.a.
1968	283	—
1975	303	+0.98%
1982	353	+2.21%
1990	411	+1.92%
1999	467	+1.43%
2007	492	+0.65%
2012	603	+4.15%
2017	659	+1.79%
2023	642	−0.43%
Source: INSEE

== See also ==
- Communes of the Eure department
