= Troan =

Village in Cornwall, England

Troan is a hamlet in the parish of St Enoder, Cornwall, England, United Kingdom. It is north of Summercourt.
