= Amfreville, Calvados =

Amfreville
- Commune
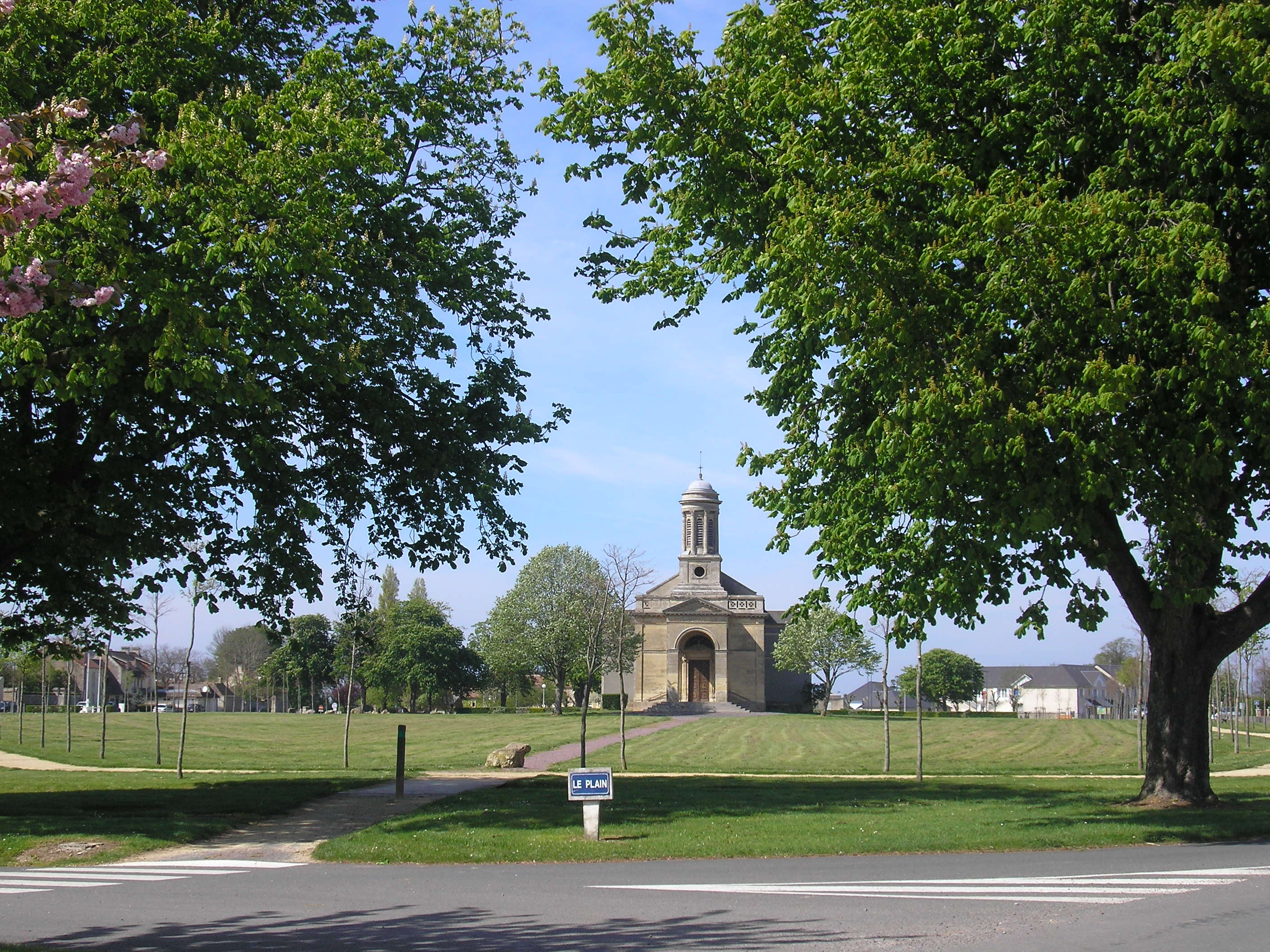
- The Square and Saint Martin church

- Coat of arms
- Location of Amfreville
- Location within France Location within Normandy
- Coordinates: 49°14′54″N 0°14′06″W
- Country: France
- Region: Normandy
- Department: Calvados
- Arrondissement: Lisieux
- Canton: Cabourg
- Intercommunality: CC Normandie-Cabourg-Pays d'Auge

Government
  - Mayor (2020–2026): Xavier Madelaine
- Area^{1}: 6.06 km^{2} (2.34 sq mi)
- Elevation: 50 m (160 ft)
- Highest elevation: 57 m (187 ft)
- Lowest elevation: 0 m (0 ft)
- Population (2023): 1,394
  - Density: 230/km^{2} (596/sq mi)
- Time zone: UTC+01:00 (CET)
  - Summer (DST): UTC+02:00 (CEST)
- INSEE/Postal code: 14009 /14860
- ^{1} French Land Register data, which excludes lakes, ponds, glaciers > 1 km^{2} (0.386 sq mi or 247 acres) and river estuaries.

Amfreville (French pronunciation: [ɑ̃fʁəvil]) is a commune in the Calvados department in the Normandy region of north-western France.

== Geography ==
Amfreville is located some 25 km north-west of Caen and 1 km south-east of Ouistreham mostly on the right bank of the Orne with a small portion on the left bank. It can be accessed by the D514 from Sallenelles in the north passing through the west of the commune then continuing south then west to Bénouville. Access to the village is by the D37B from Breville-les-Monts in the south-east and continuing through the village north to Sallenelles. There is also the D236 going east from the village to Bavent. There are several hamlets in the commune apart from the main village: Hameau Oger (or Hauger), Hameau La Rue and Le Plein form a continuous urban area with the main village, and the hamlets of La Basse Ecarde and La Haute Ecarde are to the west. The rest of the commune and the entire left bank of the Orne portion are farmland.

The river Orne separates the two parts of the commune with no direct access across the river - the nearest crossing is on the D514 to the south of the commune. A stream forms the northern border of the commune flowing into the Orne.

== History ==
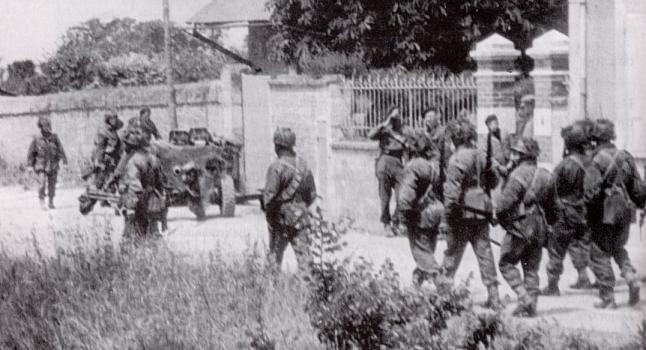
Commandos and 9th Battalion in Amfreville, June 1944

Amfreville is located close to Sword Beach on the Normandy coast, which is one of the beaches where the Allies executed their Normandy landings. It is also close to the important medieval city of Caen, which figured in the Allied landings. Amfreville is considered to have been officially "liberated" from the German occupation of World War II on 6 June 1944.

Amfreville is understood to be the ancestral home of the Umfraville family of Anglo-Norman nobles who occupied England under William the Conqueror and his successors, and went on to become British nobility under the titles the Barons of Prudhoe and the Lords of Redesdale, and later also gained Scottish lands and the title Earl of Angus.

Images of these historical associations with the Norman Conquest of 1066 and the Normandy Landings of 1944 are incorporated in the town's heraldry.

=== Heraldry ===
Arms of Amfreville	Blazon: Party per pale, first Azure a soldier of Or suspended from a parachute argent all surmounted by a dove the same, in chief gules charged with two lions passant guardant one over the other; second of Vert with a garb of Or, in chief Azure with two fesse wavy in argent debruised by a barque contourned of Gules sailed the same.

== Administration ==
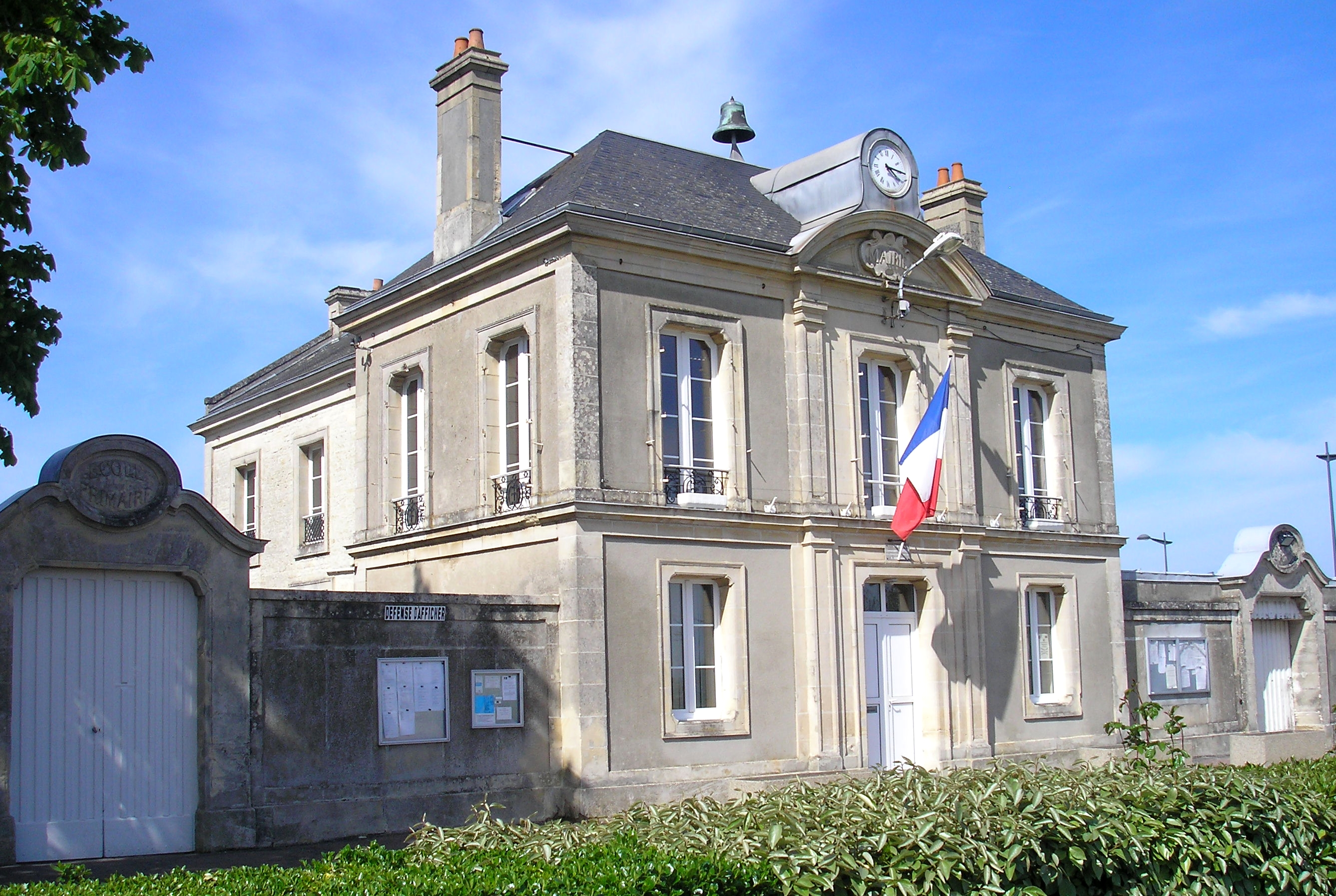
The Town Hall

List of Successive Mayors

From	To	Name	Party	Position
1989	2026	Xavier Madelaine	PS	SNCF Officer

=== Twinning ===
Amfreville has twinning associations with:

- Hillerse (Germany) since 1999.
- Brunehaut (Belgium) since 2005.
- Dolton (United Kingdom) since 1981.

== Population ==
The inhabitants of the commune are known as Amfrevillais or Amfrevillaises in French.

Historical population
Year	Pop.	±% p.a.
1968	444	—
1975	615	+4.76%
1982	819	+4.18%
1990	905	+1.26%
1999	1,056	+1.73%
2007	1,188	+1.48%
2012	1,276	+1.44%
2017	1,399	+1.86%
2023	1,394	−0.06%
Source: INSEE

== Sites and monuments ==
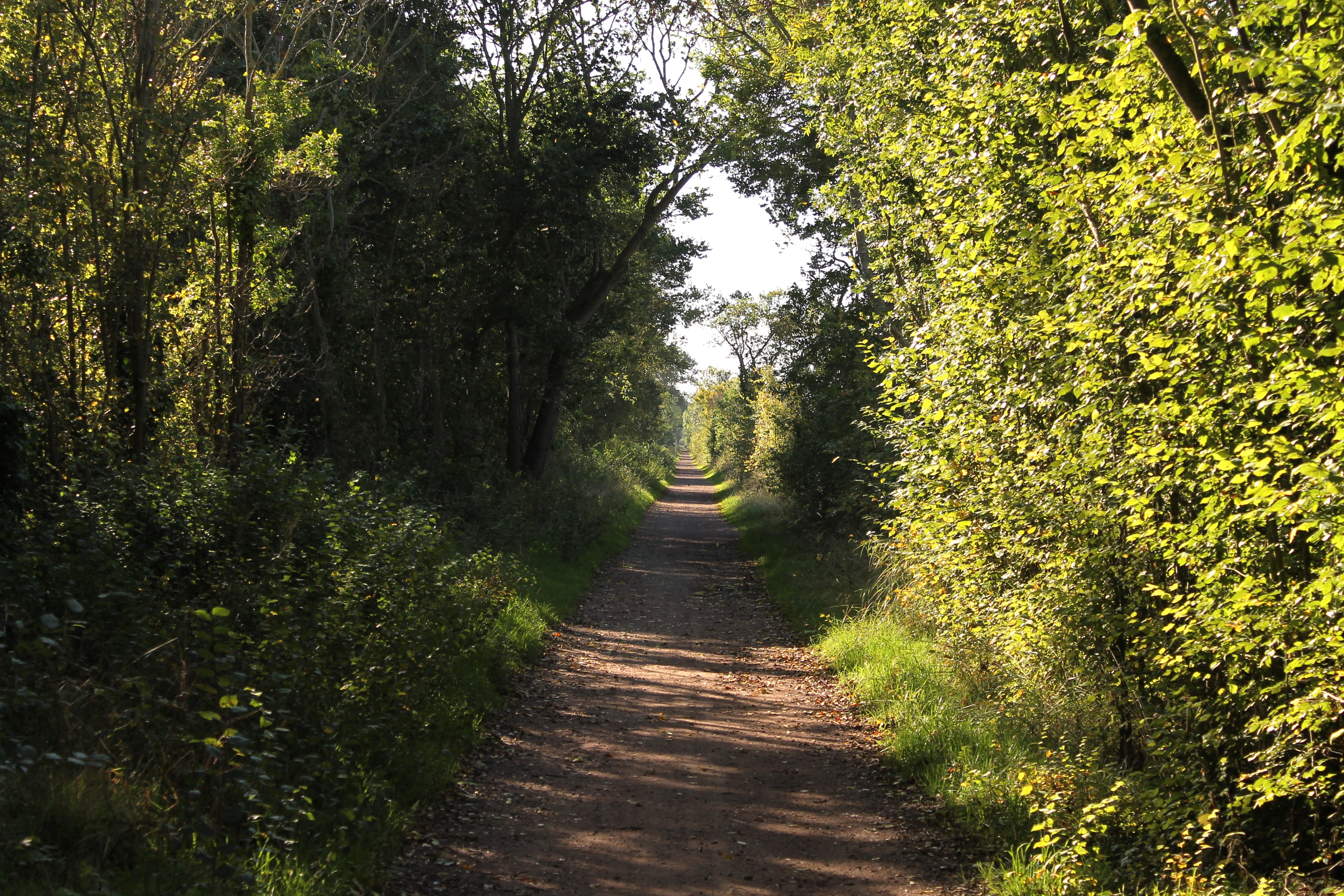
A country lane on the right bank of the Orne

- Le Plain (previously Le Plein) (49°14′50″N 0°14′02″W) is a place with a tree plantation, a church, and a village pond. It is registered as a site of ecological interest for flora and fauna.
- Château du Hameau Hauger (sometimes spelled Oger), (49°15′15″N 0°14′06″W) dating from the end of the 18th or the beginning of the 19th century.
- Church of St Martin.(49°14′50″N 0°14′03″W)

== See also ==
- Communes of the Calvados department

=== Bibliography ===
- Amfréville en Baie de l'Orne, Gillonne and Rémi Desquesnes, 2001 (in French)
