= Bréville-les-Monts =

- Commune
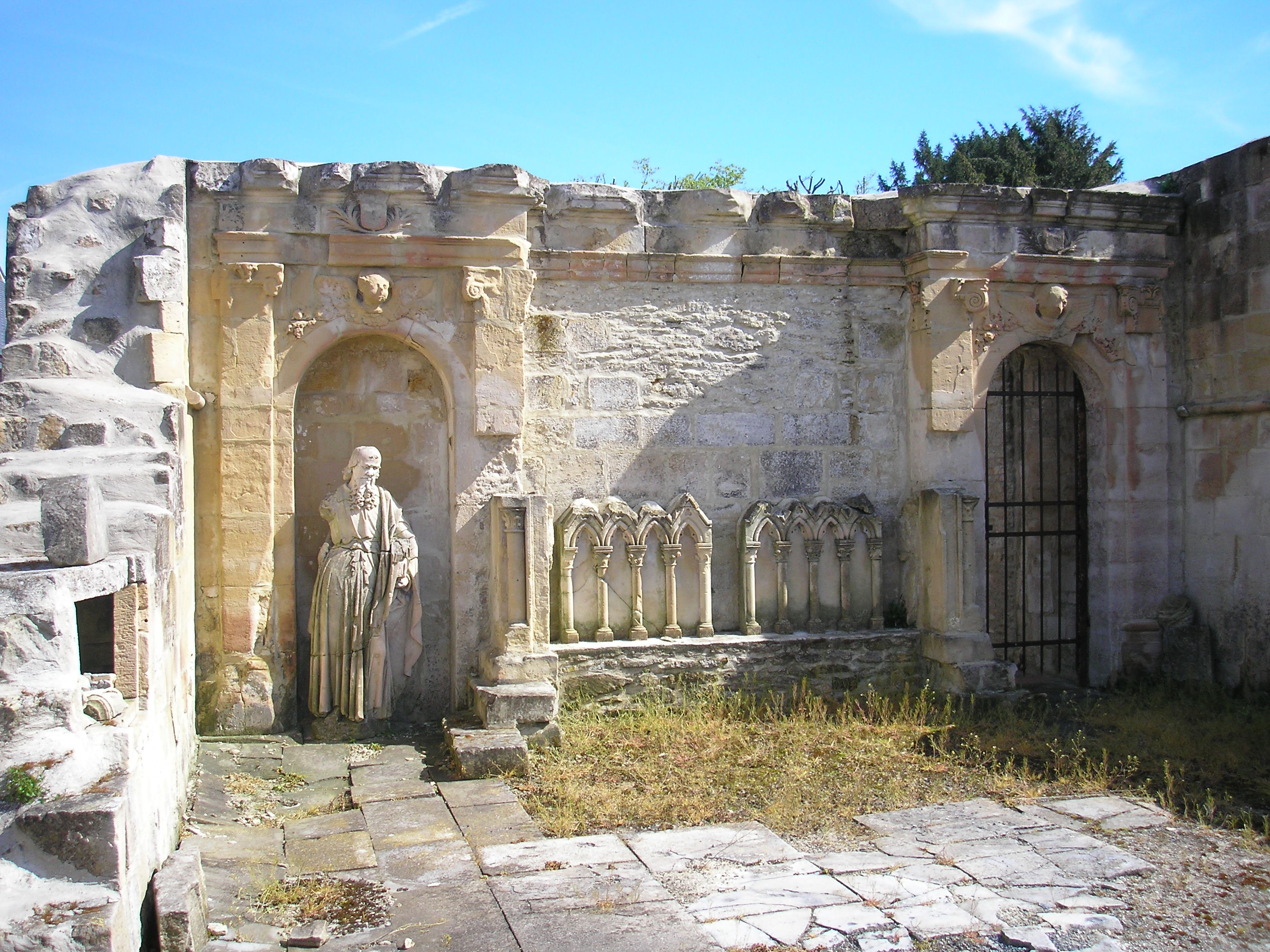
- Ruins of the church of St. Peter

- Coat of arms
- Location of Bréville-les-Monts
- Location within France Location within Normandy
- Coordinates: 49°14′27″N 0°13′34″W
- Country: France
- Region: Normandy
- Department: Calvados
- Arrondissement: Lisieux
- Canton: Cabourg
- Intercommunality: CC Normandie-Cabourg-Pays d'Auge

Government
  - Mayor (2020–2026): Jean-Marc Paiola
- Area^{1}: 4.75 km^{2} (1.83 sq mi)
- Elevation: 65 m (213 ft)
- Highest elevation: 63 m (207 ft)
- Lowest elevation: 11 m (36 ft)
- Population (2023): 661
  - Density: 139/km^{2} (360/sq mi)
- Time zone: UTC+01:00 (CET)
  - Summer (DST): UTC+02:00 (CEST)
- INSEE/Postal code: 14106 /14860
- ^{1} French Land Register data, which excludes lakes, ponds, glaciers > 1 km^{2} (0.386 sq mi or 247 acres) and river estuaries.

Bréville-les-Monts (French pronunciation: [bʁevil le mɔ̃]) is a commune in the Calvados department in the Normandy region in northwestern France. It was the location for the Battle of Bréville fought by the 6th Airborne Division during the Second World War.

== Geography ==
The commune includes the hamlets of Hameau des Dumonts and Le Bas de Bréville to the north, and Le Mesnil to the south. To the east is the Château Saint-Côme, a private residence and scene of heavy fighting during the Normandy campaign.

== History ==
The town was formerly called Bréville, and was officially renamed Bréville-les-Monts on 26 August 2004.

== Population ==
Historical population
Year	Pop.	±% p.a.
1968	387	—
1975	441	+1.88%
1982	529	+2.63%
1990	515	−0.33%
1999	565	+1.03%
2007	670	+2.15%
2012	650	−0.60%
2017	655	+0.15%
2023	661	+0.15%
Source: INSEE

== Twin towns ==
- Hillerse in Germany

== See also ==
- Communes of the Calvados department
