= Han-sur-Lesse =

Village and district in Belgium

Coordinates: 50°7′34″N 5°11′16″E

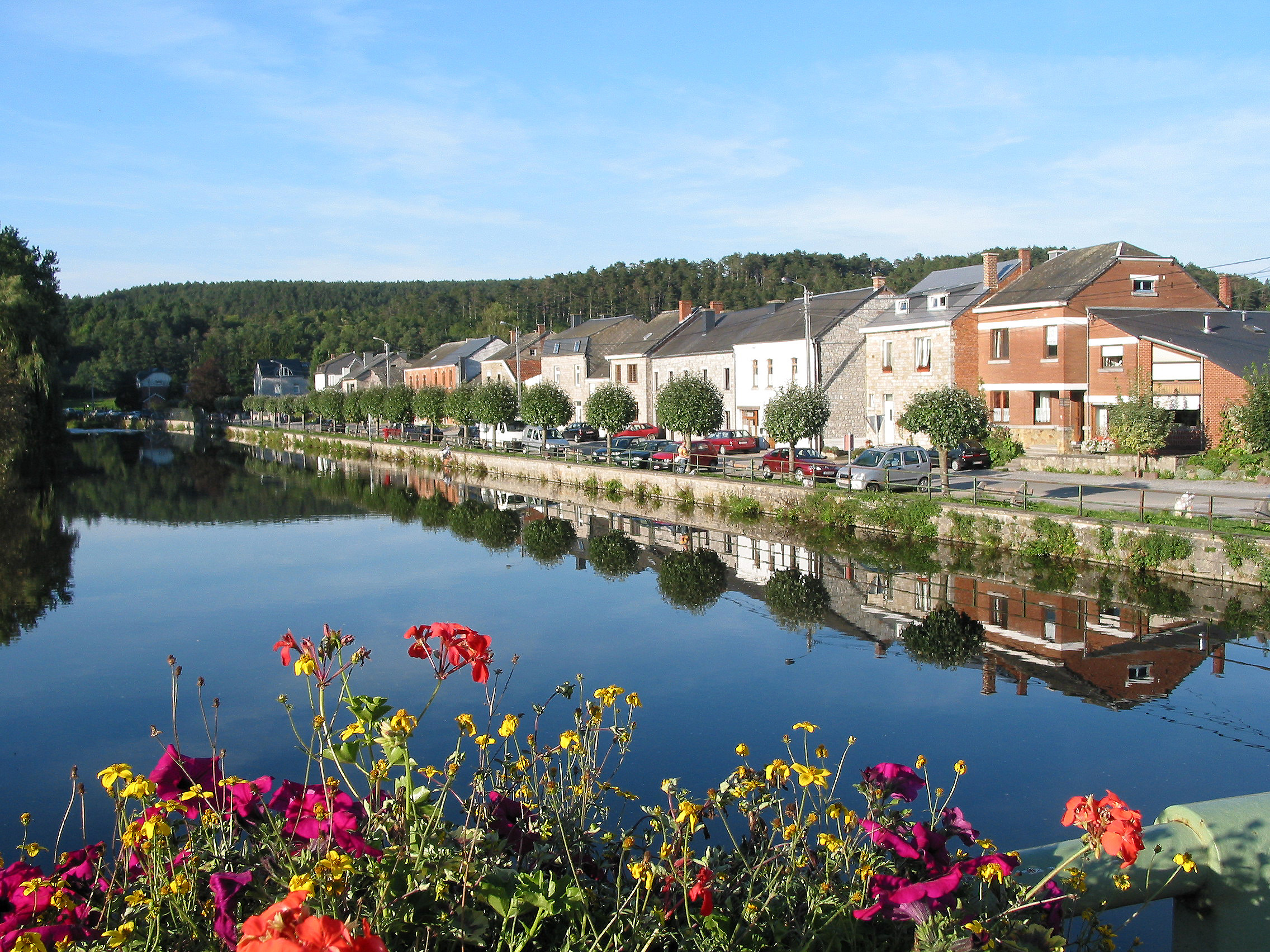
Han-sur-Lesse

Han-sur-Lesse (French pronunciation: [ɑ̃ syʁ lɛs], lit. 'Han on Lesse'; Walloon: Han-so-Lesse) is a village of Wallonia and a district of the municipality of Rochefort, located in the province of Namur, Belgium. Han-sur-Lesse was called Ham from 1139, Ham Han Sur Lesche, from 1266, Han Sur Lece from 1465 and Ham sur lez from 1528, by which time it had 14 families. The village then declined, with plague, epidemics and Franco-Spanish wars, but by 1766, there were 62 villagers. In 2021 the population was about 1,000.

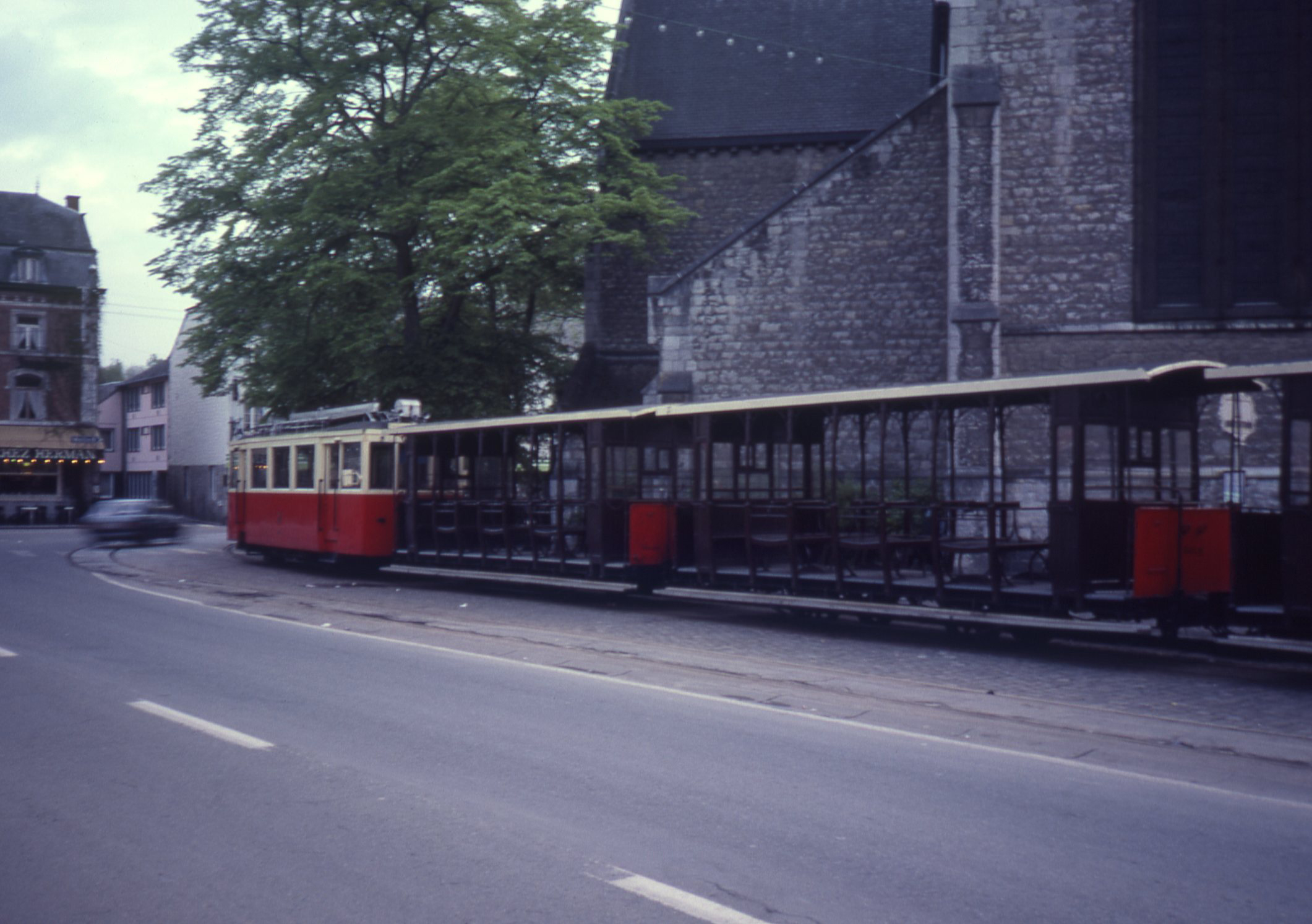
Tram outside church in 1987

The place is famous for the Grottes de Han-sur-Lesse, a cave complex carved under a hill by the river Lesse, which tourists reach via a preserved remnant of the country's vicinal tramway system. The metre gauge line opened in 1906 as a branch off the Rochefort-Han-sur-Lesse-Wellin line, which was open from 1904 to 1957. Between 1988 and 1992 the village tram terminus was moved from a loop around the church of Saint-Hubert de Han-sur-Lesse to a loop on the other side of Rue Joseph Lamotte.

The church of Saint-Hubert, in the centre of the village, was rebuilt in 1905 in a Gothic revival style by Clément Léonard and Hubert Froment.
