= Battle of Bure =

World War II battle during the Battle of the Bulge

- Part of the Battle of the Bulge during World War II
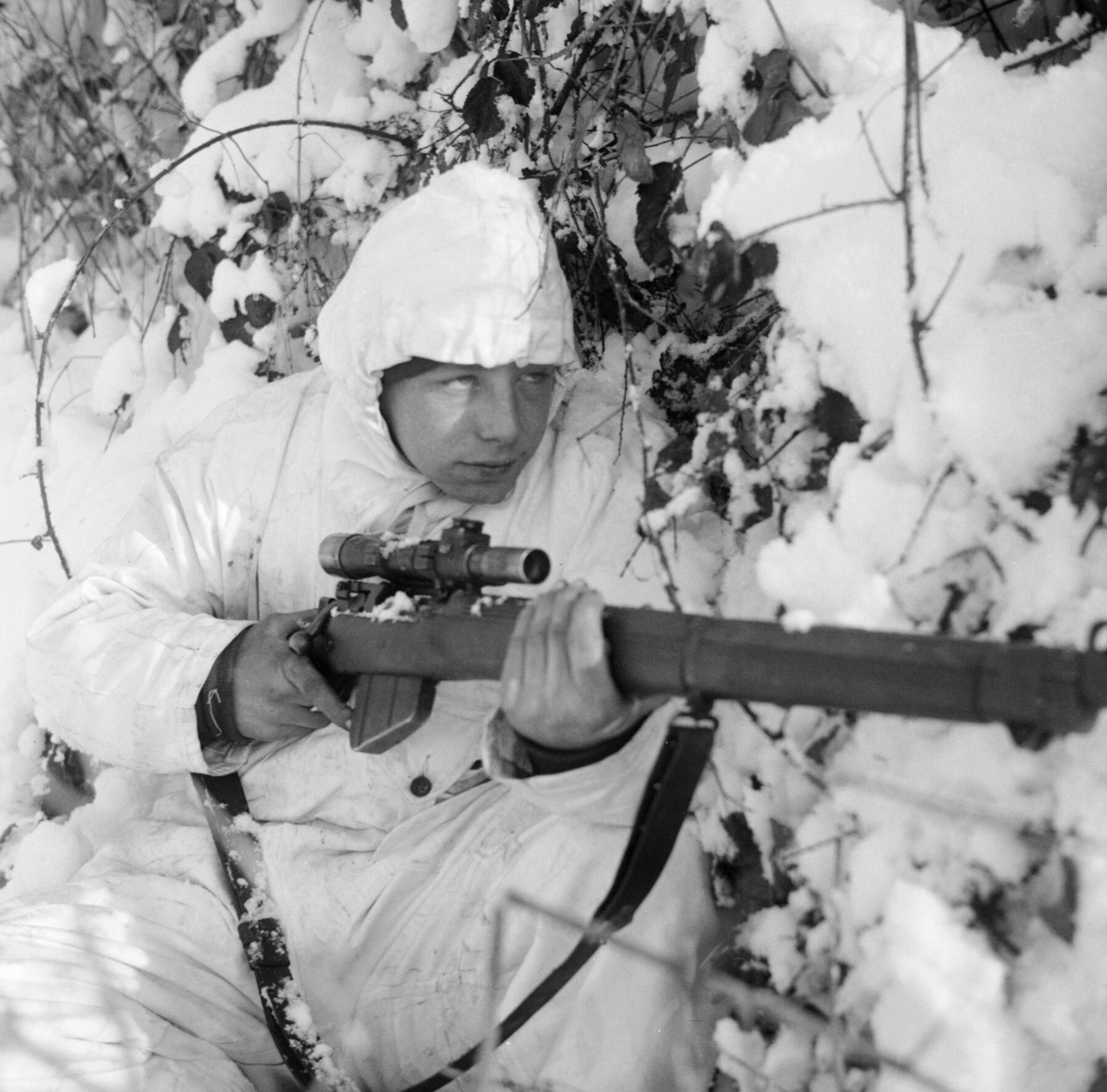
- British Airborne Sniper in snow camouflage with Lee–Enfield rifle in the Ardennes, 14 January 1945
Date	3–5 January 1945
Location	Bure, Rochefort, and Grupont Belgium 50°05′20″N 5°15′35″E
Result	Allied victory

Belligerents
United Kingdom; Belgium	Germany

Commanders and leaders
(United Kingdom) Nigel Poett	(Nazi Germany) Unknown

Units involved
(United Kingdom) 5th Para Brigade (Belgium) 5th SAS	(Nazi Germany) Elements of 2nd Panzer Division

Casualties and losses
Roughly 250 combined killed and/or wounded 16 tanks damaged or destroyed	Roughly 500 killed and/or wounded 11 tanks damaged or destroyed

The Battle of Bure was part of the Battle of the Bulge, which lasted from 3 to 5 January 1945 during the final months of the Second World War. The battle was fought as part of the Allied counterattack to force the Germans from ground that they had captured and which had forced the Allies on the defensive. XXX Corps with British 6th Airborne Division attached, was to clear the area east of Dinant, Rochefort, Grupont and Bure in Belgium. Bure was secured after nearly three days of heavy fighting whilst Gupont and Rochefort were both cleared with little resistance and the advance continued.

== Background ==
In December 1944, the German armies launched a counter-offensive through the forests of the Ardennes. The plan was to drive across the river Meuse and on to Antwerp to split the Allied armies and their lines of communication. As part of the First Allied Airborne Army, 6th Airborne Division was available as part of the strategic reserve for the Allied forces in north-west Europe. The other two divisions available in reserve, the American 82nd and 101st Airborne, were already at Reims in northern France. At the same time the 6th Airborne, rested and re-trained after Operation Tonga (their success in Normandy), was sent from England by sea to Belgium to assist in the defence.

On Christmas Day the 6th Airborne Division moved up to take position in front of the spearhead of the German advance. By Boxing Day they had reached the defensive line between Dinant and Namur along the river Meuse. Soon afterwards, XXX corps eliminated the furthest western German penetration and advanced. The 3rd Parachute Brigade were on the left, 5th Parachute Brigade on the right and the 6th Airlanding Brigade in reserve. By the time they arrived in position the German advance had faltered.

== Battle ==
Just before New Year's Day the brigades were ordered to advance against the tip of the German salient. On 2 January 1945, they were to capture the villages of Bure and Grupont supported by the Sherman tanks of the Fife and Forfar Yeomanry detached from the 11th Armoured Division. Once these had been captured, a crossing over the river Lomme would be seized to halt any German breakthrough and thus put them on the defensive.

The following day the 13th (Lancashire) Parachute Battalion of the 5th Parachute Brigade left Resteigne on foot and at 13:00 started the attack on Bure. Supported by the tanks, 'A' Company was to secure the village, while 'B' Company secured the high ground and 'C' Company was in reserve. The attack was met immediately with heavy mortar and machine-gun fire, supported by German armour and casualties began to rise in both companies. After being repelled they regrouped and attacked again and this time 'A' Company managed to gain a foothold in the village while 'B' Company reached the high ground by which it was able to enter Bure. At 17:00 'C' Company was sent in to reinforce 'A' and 'B' Companies, who were holding half the village with difficulty but this time they were supported by tank and artillery fire.

The positions soon after the German attack had faltered

German counter-attacks now began but the battalion was able to form a tight perimeter around half the village and set up strong points in occupied buildings. They carried out fighting patrols and fought off four German counter-attacks with one on 'A' Company which was only defeated when they called down artillery fire on their own positions. In the closeness of the fighting, the paratroopers used their fighting knives to avoid giving away their locations and casualties could not be evacuated nor could supplies be brought forward.

On 4 January the battalion was subjected to a continuous artillery bombardment and fought off another five German counter-attacks, knocking out tanks with their PIATS. At one stage in the battle an ambulance got into Bure from which stepped a Sergeant of the 225th (Parachute) Field Ambulance from the Regimental Aid Post accompanied by a padre. It stopped a few yards from a German Tiger tank which had moved up to it, almost pointing its gun through the driver's window, when a German officer appeared who agreed in perfect English that the wounded could be collected but the ambulance was not to return.

By now the town of Bure was nearly a heap of rubble but the Germans clung to the houses and ruins, hid in cellars and catacombs, fighting and sniping to the end. Tiger tanks were still operating in the village which made mopping up extremely difficult. In the evening 'C' Company of the 2nd Battalion, Oxfordshire and Buckinghamshire Light Infantry from the 6th Airlanding Brigade joined the 13th Parachute Battalion as reinforcements and in the early hours of 5 January, a determined attack by the battalion pushed the bulk of the Germans out of the village, although one Tiger tank remained despite repeated PIAT attacks on it. By 21:00 the last German outpost was eliminated by 'A' Company and the village was secured, German resistance having ceased. During the same time the 7th (Light Infantry) Parachute Battalion had captured Grupont with only light resistance and with 5th Parachute Brigade's objectives now taken, the battle came to an end.

== Aftermath ==
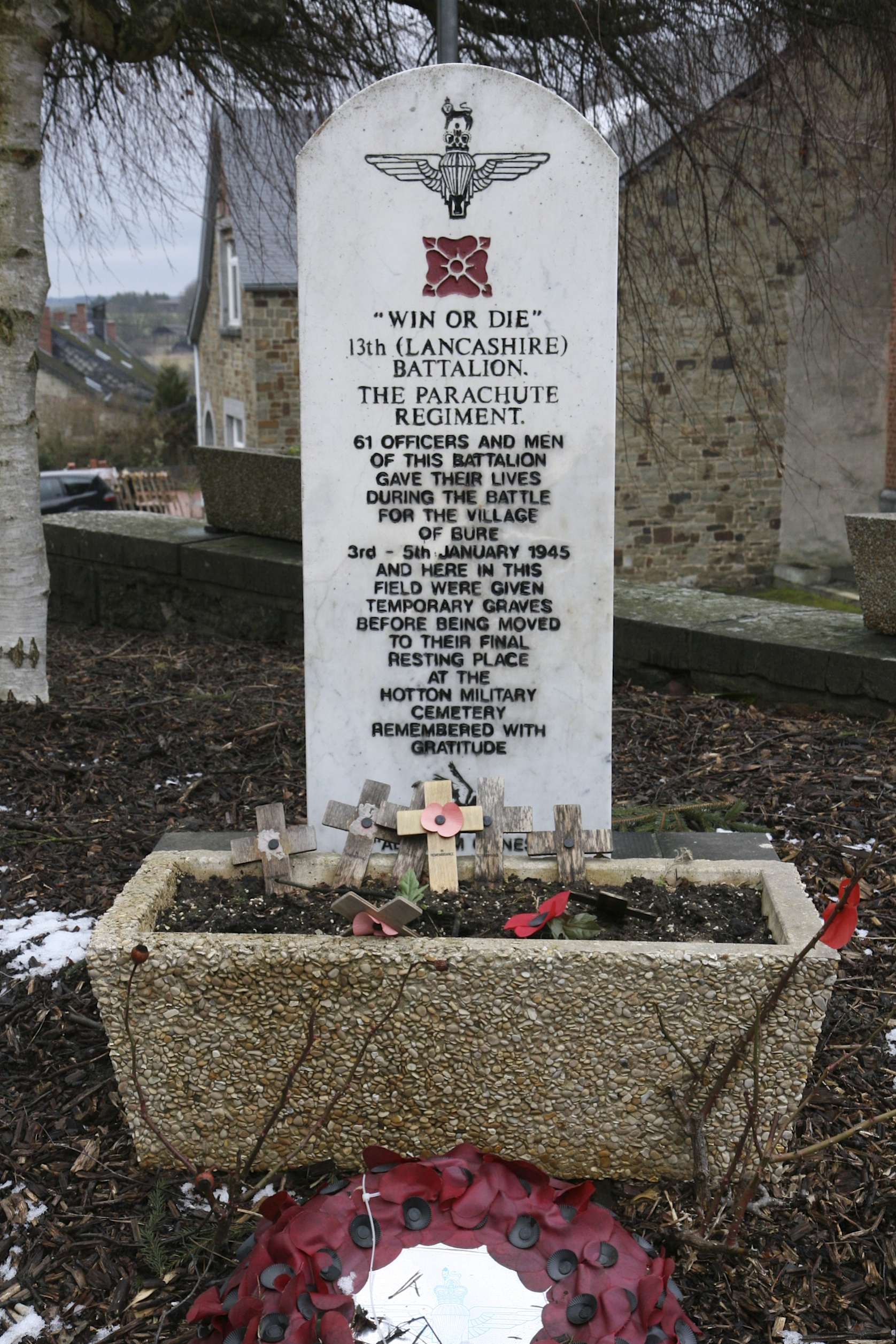
Memorial at Bure, Belgium

In the fight to capture Bure and the surrounding villages, the units suffered many casualties. The 13th (Lancashire) Parachute Battalion lost about a third of its strength: seven officers and 182 enlisted (68 killed in action). The 2nd Battalion, Ox and Bucks, lost one officer and 20 enlisted (seven KIA). The Fife and Forfar Yeomanry and 23rd Hussars also suffered severe casualties including the loss of sixteen Sherman tanks. The Belgian SAS lost three men during the action whilst supporting the attack on Bure.

The 13th (Lancashire) Parachute Battalion was pulled back from Bure and replaced by troops from the 29th Armoured Brigade. The men of the 6th Airborne went on to liberate Wavreille, Jemelle, On, Hargimont, Nassogne, Forrieres, Masbourg, Lesterny, Amberloup, Marloie, Waha and Roy. At Bande on 11 January 1945, a patrol from the 1st Canadian Parachute Battalion who had been in reserve, accompanied by the Belgian SAS, discovered the bodies of thirty-four civilians who had been murdered by the Germans on Christmas Eve.

By the middle of 6 January, the 6th Airborne Division withdrew to Holland and patrolled along the river Maas before returning to the United Kingdom in late February in preparation for their next undertaking in Operation Varsity. When General Courtney Hodges commanding the First US Army joined up with the Third US Army (General George S. Patton) on 16 January 1945, the Allies launched a counter-offensive towards the German border which recaptured all the ground that had been gained during the offensive.

=== Legacy ===
A memorial dedicated to 13 Para stands in the centre of Bure. In the church, there is a memorial book to the men of the 6th British Airborne Division killed in action during the Ardennes campaign, in addition to the Commonwealth War Graves Commission cemetery at Hotton.

== Bibliography ==
Notes

Bibliography

- Harclerode, Peter (2005). Wings Of War: Airborne Warfare 1918–1945. London, United Kingdom: Weidenfeld & Nicolson. ISBN 978-0-304-36730-6.
- Hastings, Max (2005). Armageddon: The Battle for Germany 1944–45. London, United Kingdom: Macmillan. ISBN 0-330-49062-1.
- Saunders, Hilary St George (1971). The Red Beret. London: New English Library. ISBN 978-0-450-01006-4.
- Toland, John (1959). Battle: The Story of the Bulge. U of Nebraska Press. ISBN 9780803294370.
- Whiting, Charles (2003). The Battle of the Bulge: Britain's Untold Story. Sutton Pub Limited. ISBN 9780750931809.
- Woolhouse, Andrew (2013). 13 - Lucky For Some: The History of the 13th (Lancashire) Parachute Battalion. CreateSpace Independent Publishing Platform. ISBN 978-1482029161.
