= Caves of Han-sur-Lesse =

Caves in Wallonia, Belgium

Coordinates: 50°7.1′N 5°11.43′E

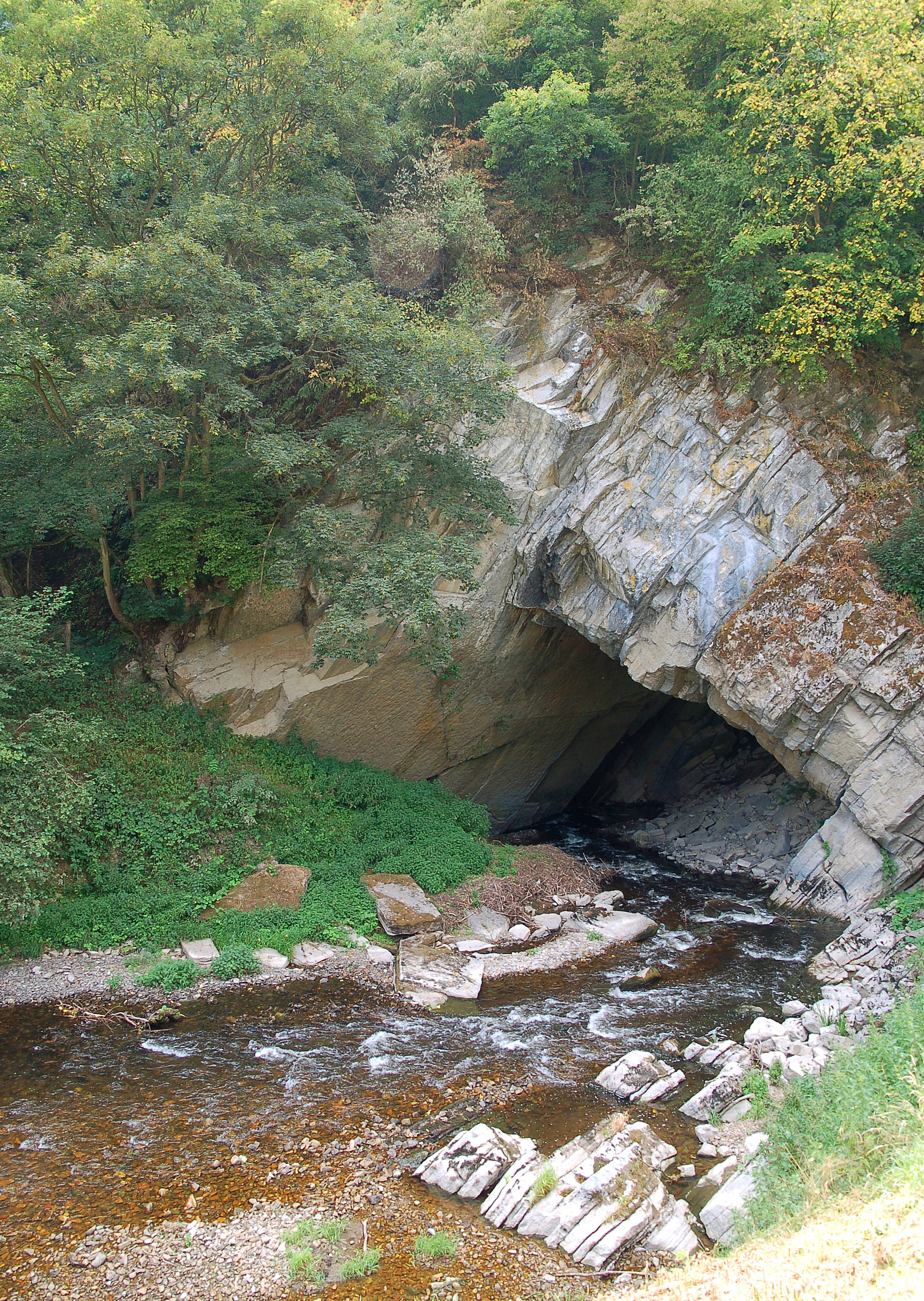
The Gouffre de Belvaux, where the Lesse goes underground

The Caves of Han-sur-Lesse (in French: Grottes de Han-sur-Lesse or simply Grottes de Han) refers to a natural complex of caves in Belgium. A major Belgian tourist attraction (around 250-300,000 visitors per year), the caves are located in Wallonia, on the outskirts of the village of Han-sur-Lesse.

The caves were formed as the result of an underground erosion of a limestone hill by the river Lesse. For most of its length a meandering river, it abruptly plunges into a sinkhole not far from Han-sur-Lesse. This hole is known as the gouffre de Belvaux (English: the Belvaux abyss), where it forces its way under the hill over a distance of over 1 kilometer (1/2 mi) as the crow flies before streaming through the cave complex known as the Grottes de Han.

== Cave complex ==
The caves have a constant temperature of 13 °C (55 °F) and a high level of humidity. The largest room in the complex is called La Salle du Dôme (the Hall of the Dome); it is 150 metres (490 ft) across with a vaulted ceiling that reaches 127 metres (417 ft).

Although modern exploration of the complex began in 1771, the caves have been known to locals for much longer. Bronze Age and Stone Age relics have been found inside, indicating use from at least the 5th century BC.

Access is only possible via a vintage streetcar, a remnant of the country's once extensive vicinal tramway system, which departs from the center of Han-sur-Lesse. The entry to the caves is about 2 km (1 1/4 mi) from the village. The guided tour takes about an hour to an hour and a half and includes a sound and light show in one of the largest chambers of the cave system and an ending with a simulated cannon shot to demonstrate the caves' acoustic properties. Visitors used to exit the caves by way of a short boat ride at the point where the Lesse emerges on the surface, but since 2009 this has been replaced by a bridge.

== Gallery ==
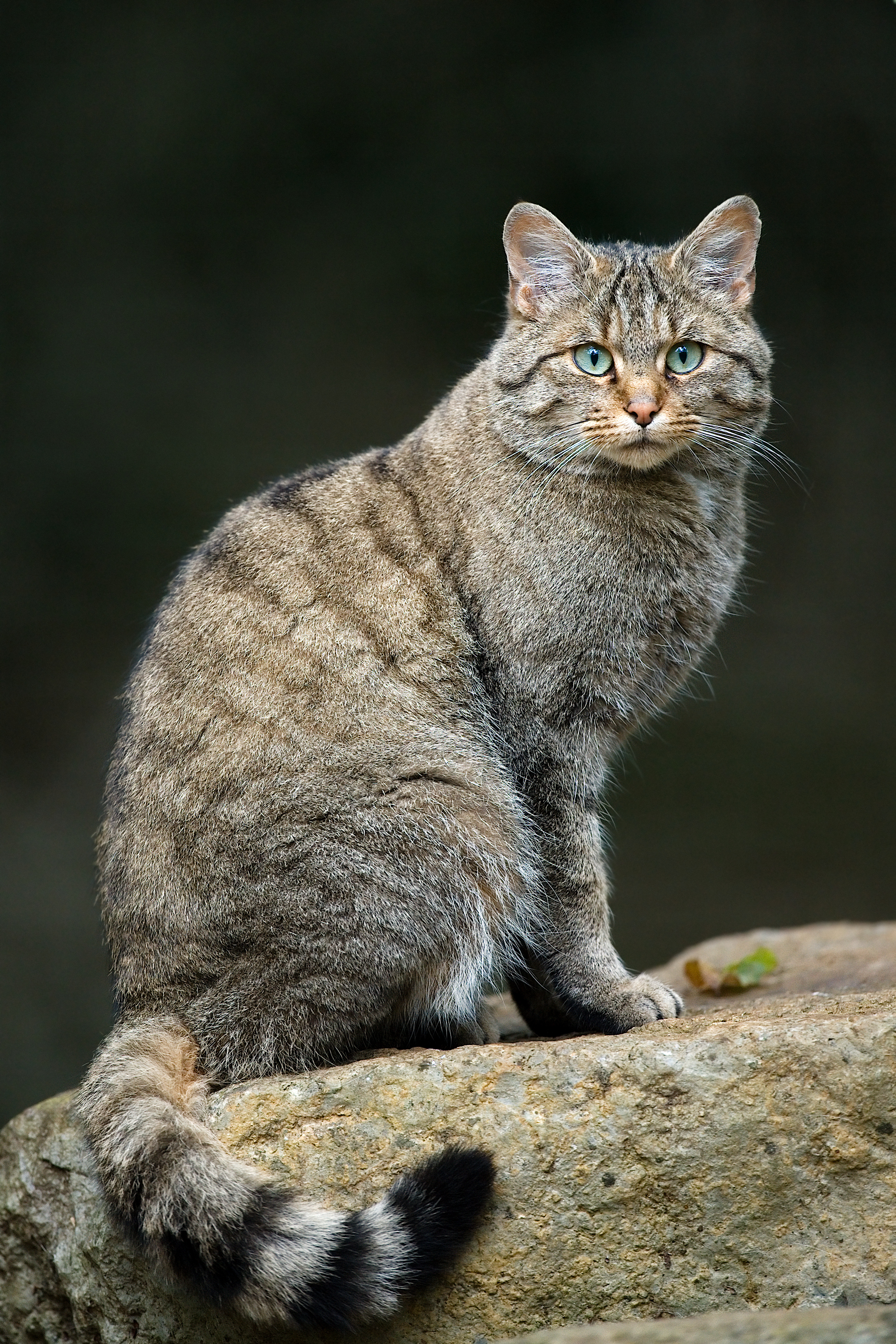
European wildcat (Felis silvestris) found at the caves

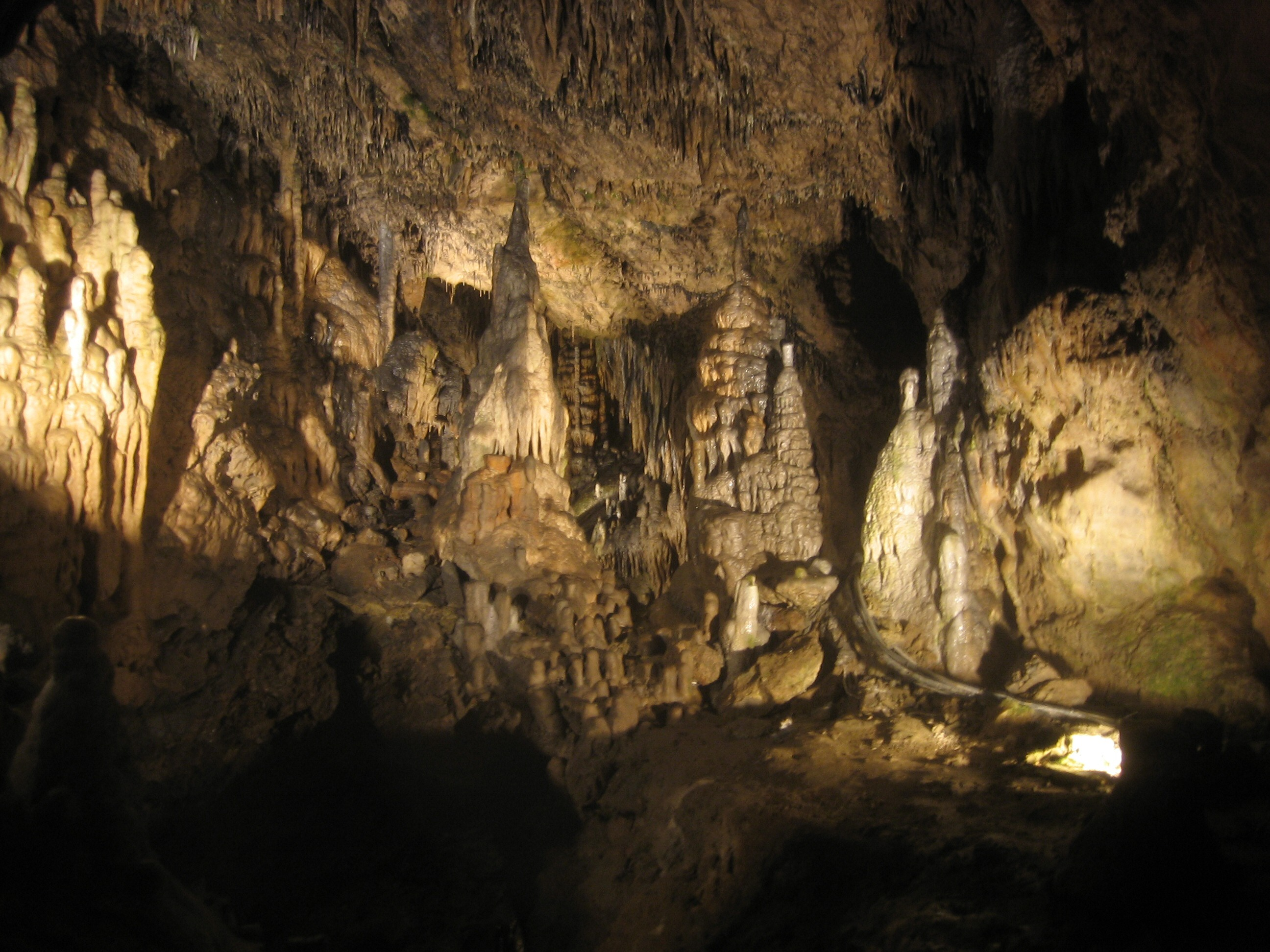
Inside one of the chambers

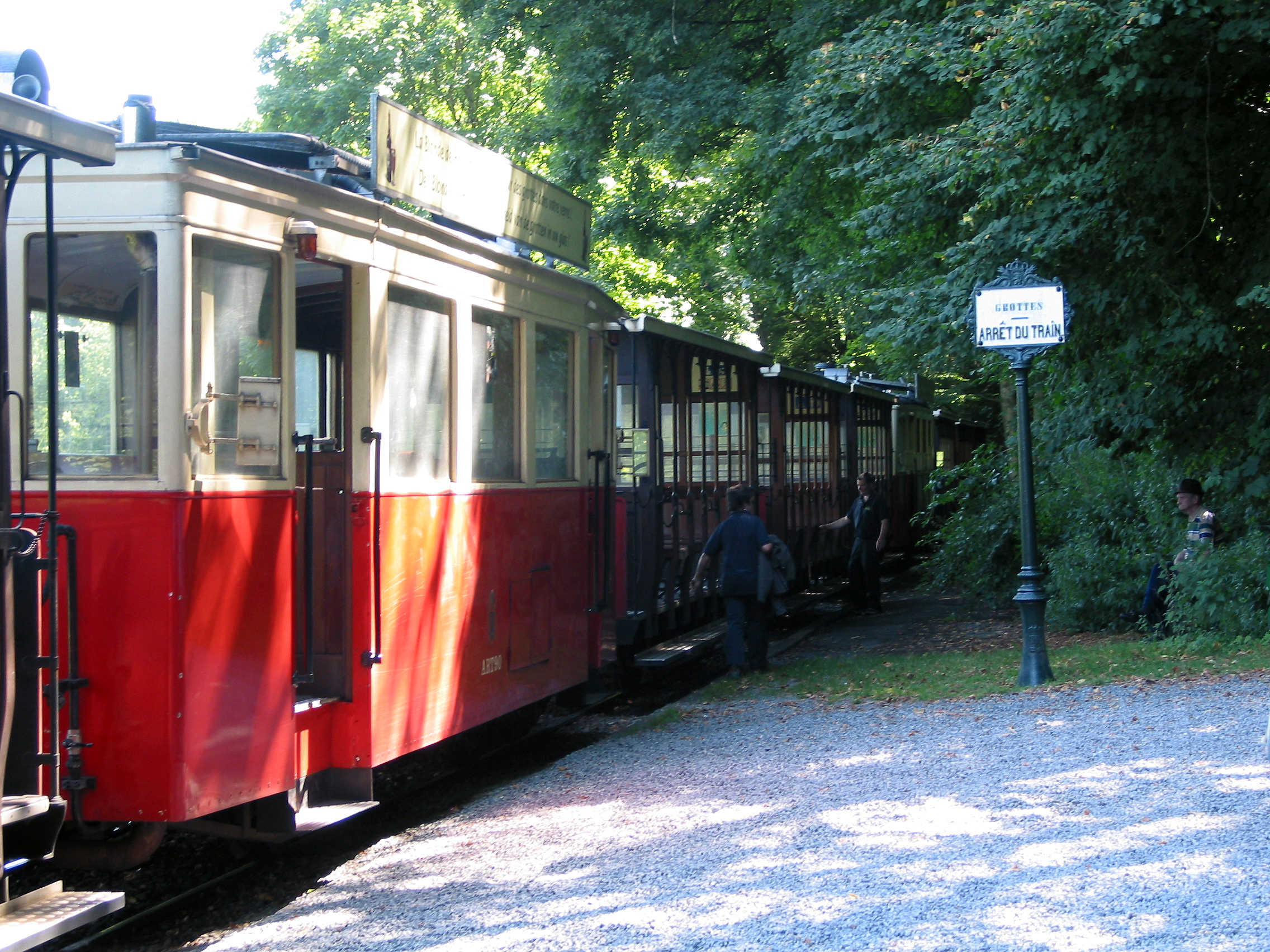
Access to the caves is only possible with this historic streetcar

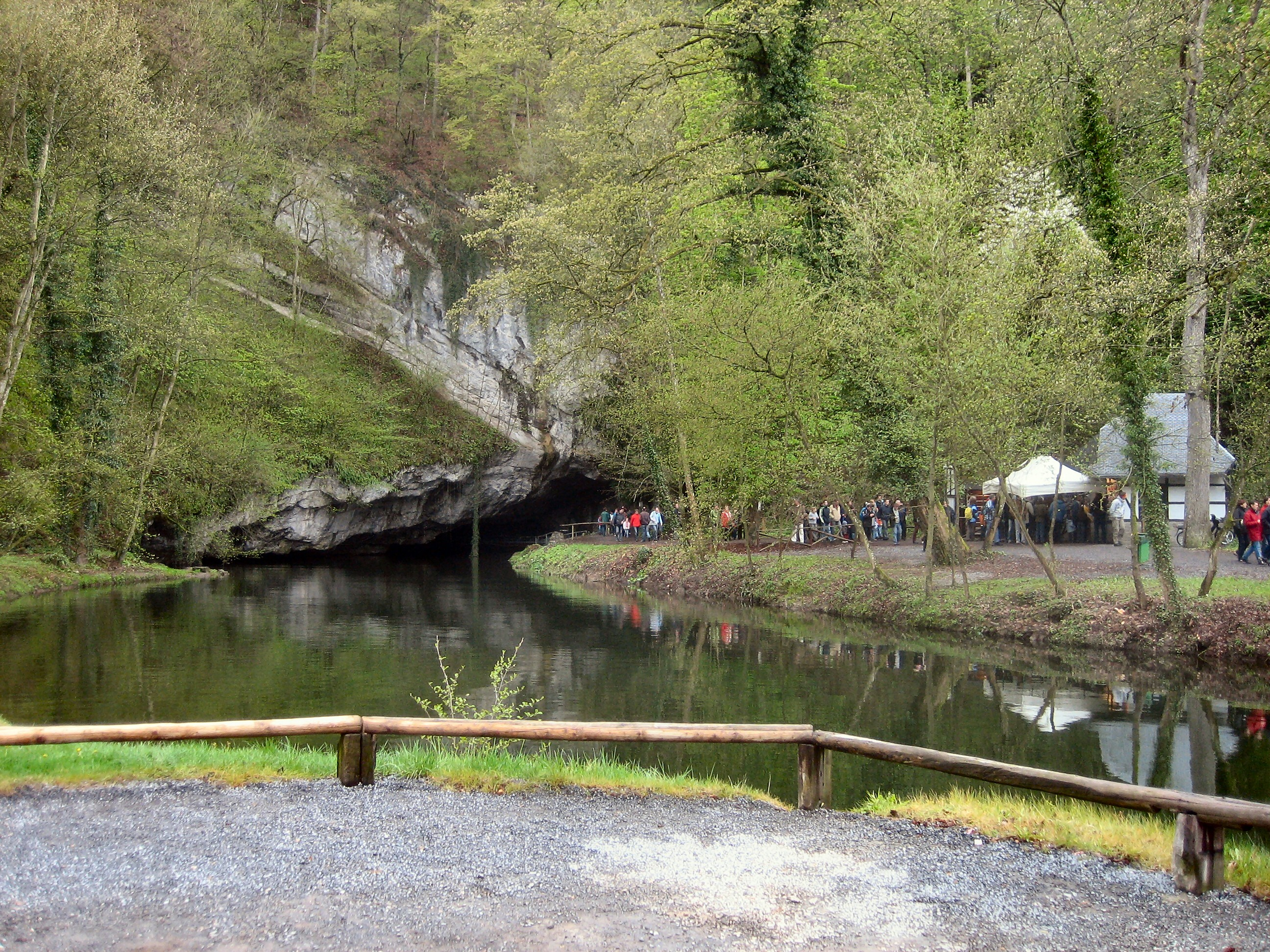
The exit of the caves

== Bibliography ==
- Stenuit, Robert with Jasinski, Marc (1966). Caves and the marvellous world beneath us. Trans. Harry Pearman. New York: A.S. Barnes and Company.
