= Arrondissement of Neufchâteau =

Arrondissement of Neufchâteau may refer to:

- Arrondissement of Neufchâteau, Belgium, an arrondissement in the Province of Luxembourg in Belgium
- Arrondissement of Neufchâteau, Vosges, an arrondissement in the Vosges department in France
