= Ave-et-Auffe =

Ave-et-Auffe Åve-el-Fåmene (Walloon)
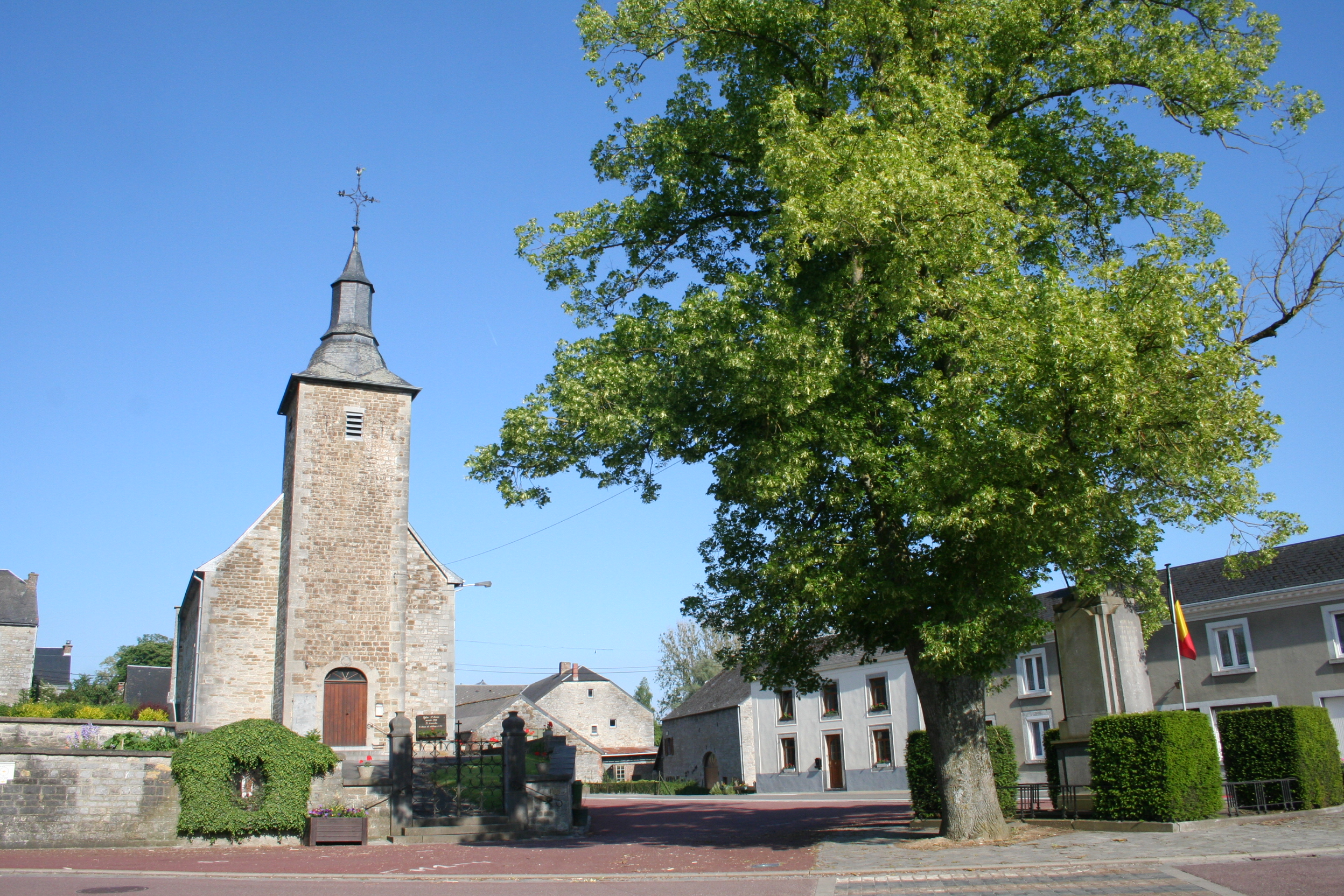
- Auffe, Ave-et-Auffe

- Location within Belgium Location within Europe
- Coordinates: 50°06′32″N 05°08′34″E
- Country: Belgium
- Region: Wallonia
- Province: Namur
- Municipality: Rochefort

Ave-et-Auffe (French pronunciation: [av e of], lit. 'Ave and Auffe'; Walloon: Åve-el-Fåmene) is a village of Wallonia and a district of the municipality of Rochefort, located in the province of Namur, Belgium.

The name comes from the way Walloons pronounces Åve : Walloon pronunciation: [oːf].

The area was settled during the Merovingian times. The two villages of Ave and Auffe grew together and were fused in 1826. The village church in Ave dates from 1772 and the chapel in Auffe is also from the 18th century.
