= Church of Our Lady of the Visitation, Rochefort =

Church in Belgium

Coordinates: 50°09′42″N 5°13′23″E

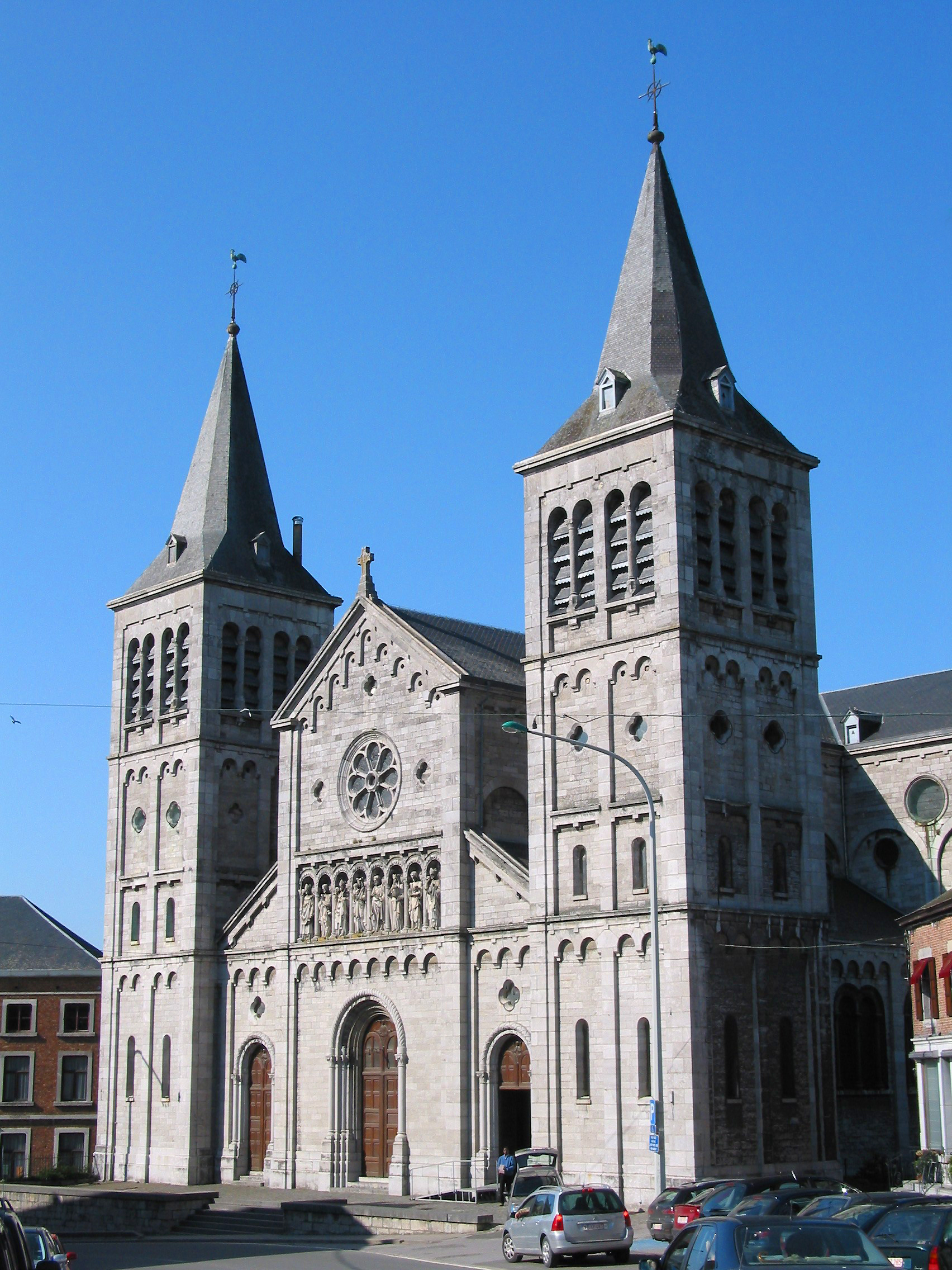
- Interactive map of Church of Our Lady of the Visitation, Rochefort
- Designer: Jean-Pierre Cluysenaar
- Type: Church
- Material: Local limestone
- Beginning date: 24 May 1874
- Inauguration date: 11 November 1874

The Church of Our Lady of the Visitation (French: Église Notre-Dame de la Visitation), also known as the Church of the Visitation of the Holy Virgin (French: Église de la Visitation-de-la-Sainte-Vierge), is a Catholic church and seat of a deanery in Rochefort, Belgium.

== History ==
The first church edifice dates back to 1041, making it the oldest building in the municipality of Behogne-Rochefort. The church burned during the offensive of the army of the Count of Duras in 1653; it was rebuilt and restored in 1782. The current building was designed by the Dutch architect Jean-Pierre Cluysenaar. The church was put into service on 24 May 1874 and inaugurated on 11 November of the same year by Théodore-Joseph Gravez, Bishop of Namur.

== Architecture ==
The church is built in the neo-Romanesque style with local limestone. The central façade, flanked by two towers, is decorated with a rose window and bears eight statues at its centre.

== Gallery ==
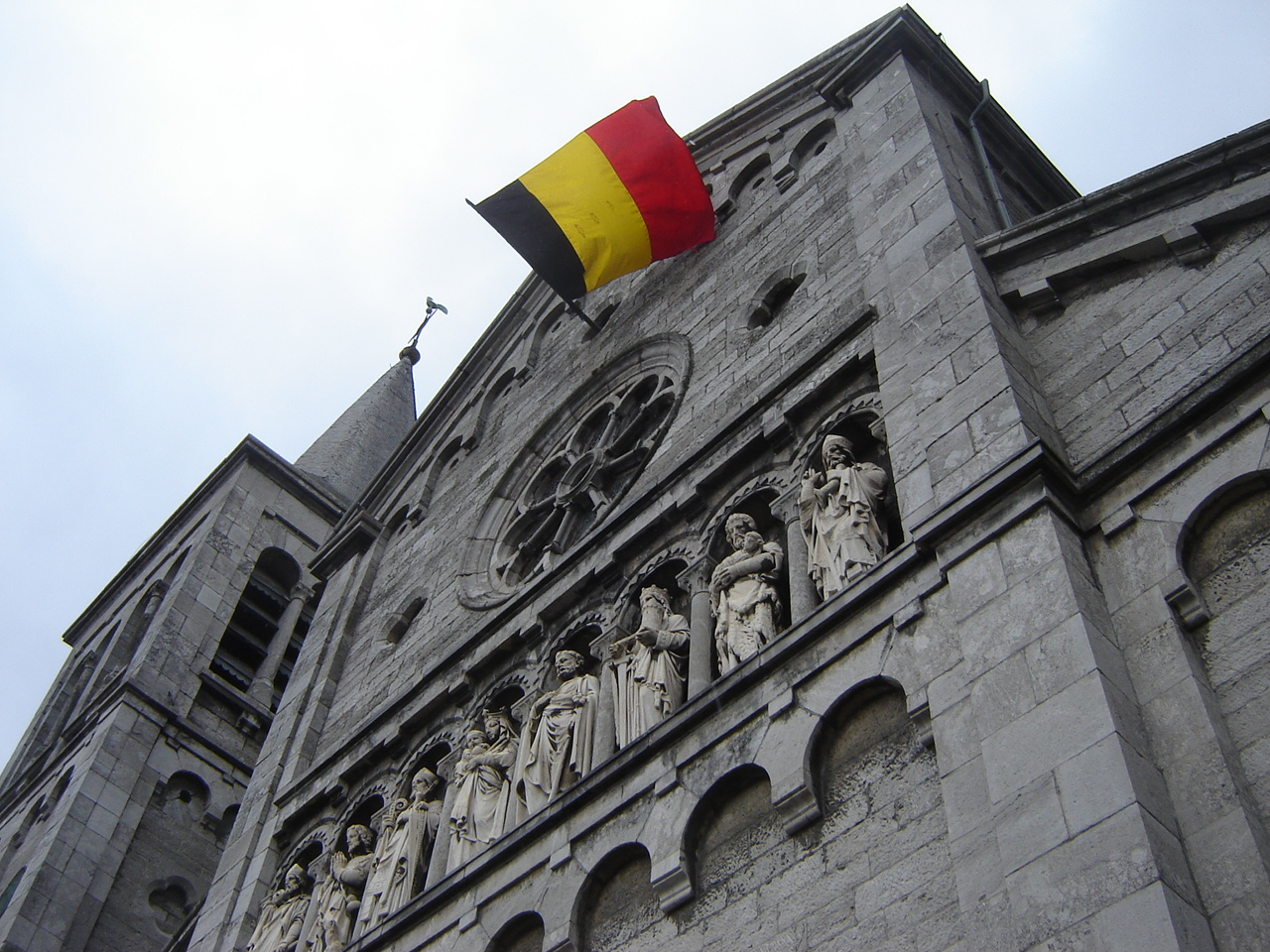
Central façade

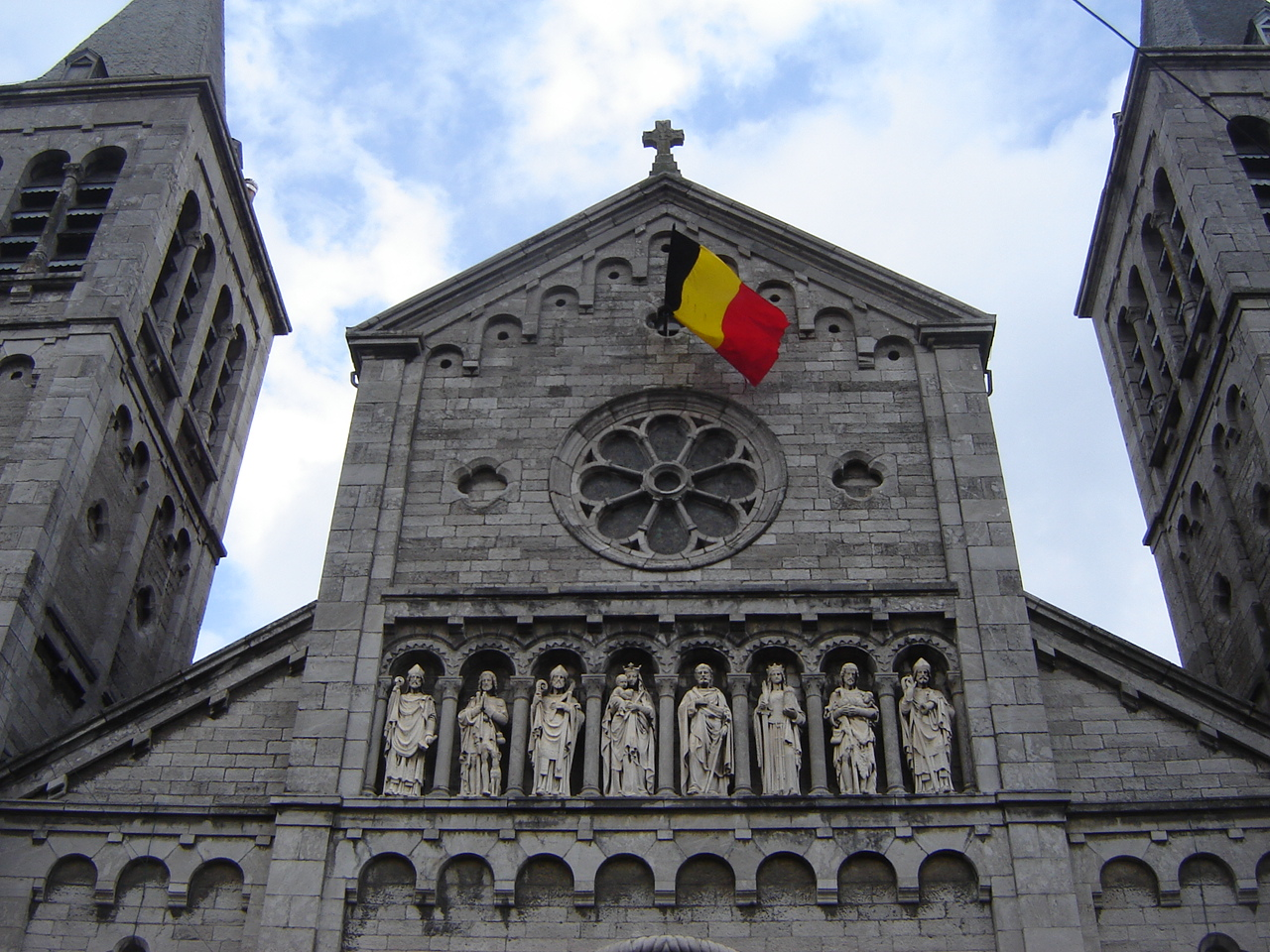
Central façade

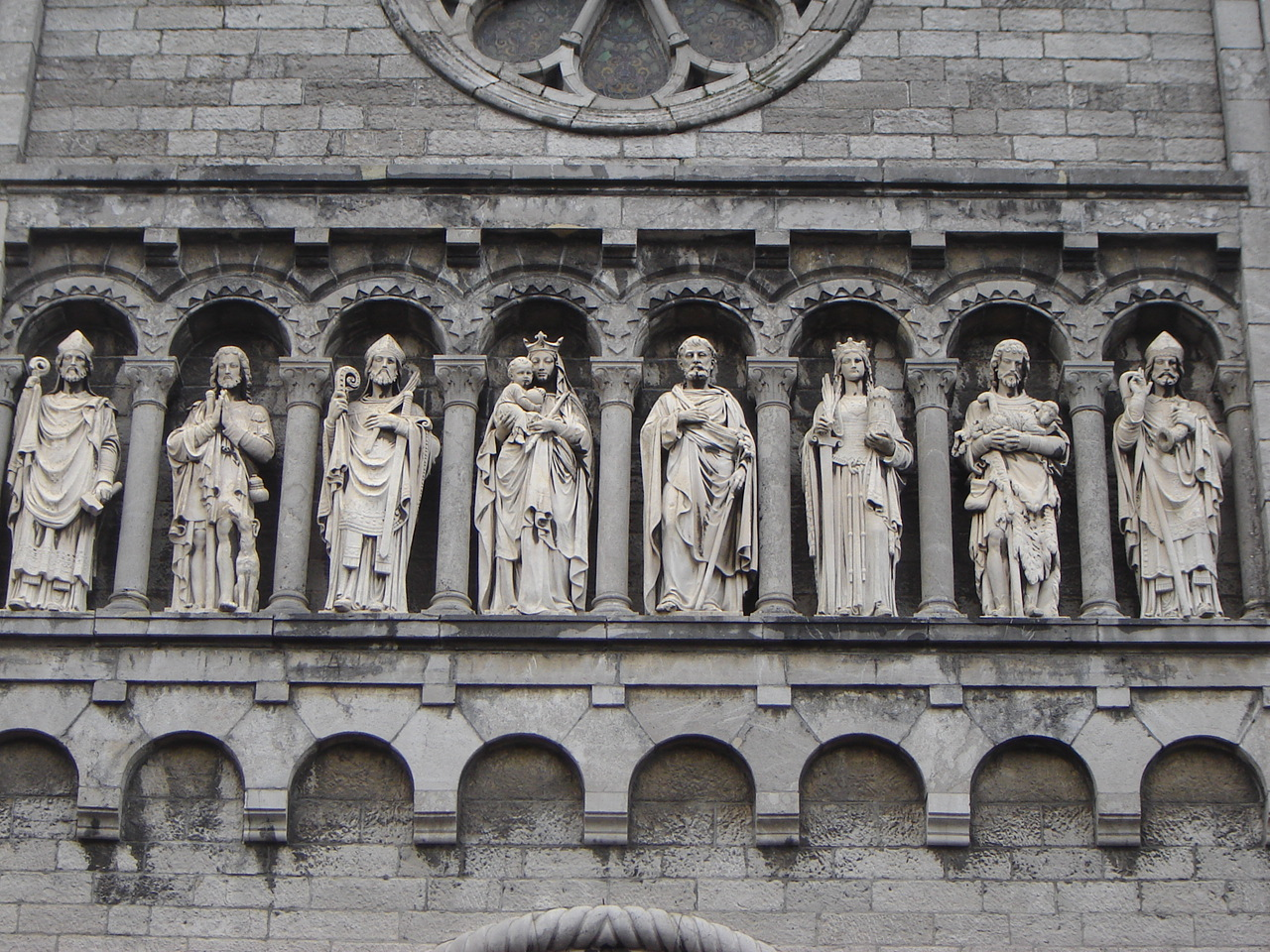
The eight statues

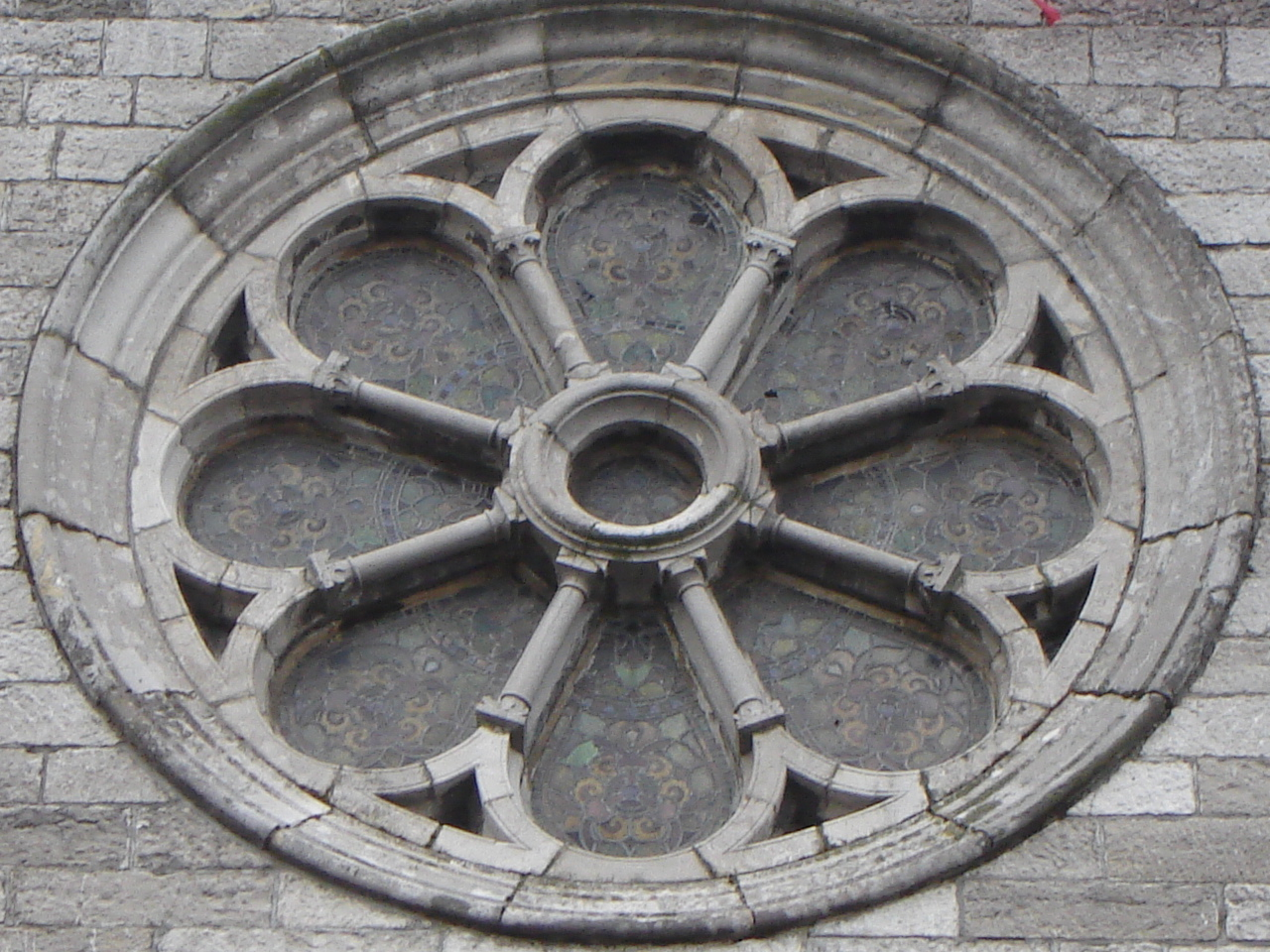
Rose window

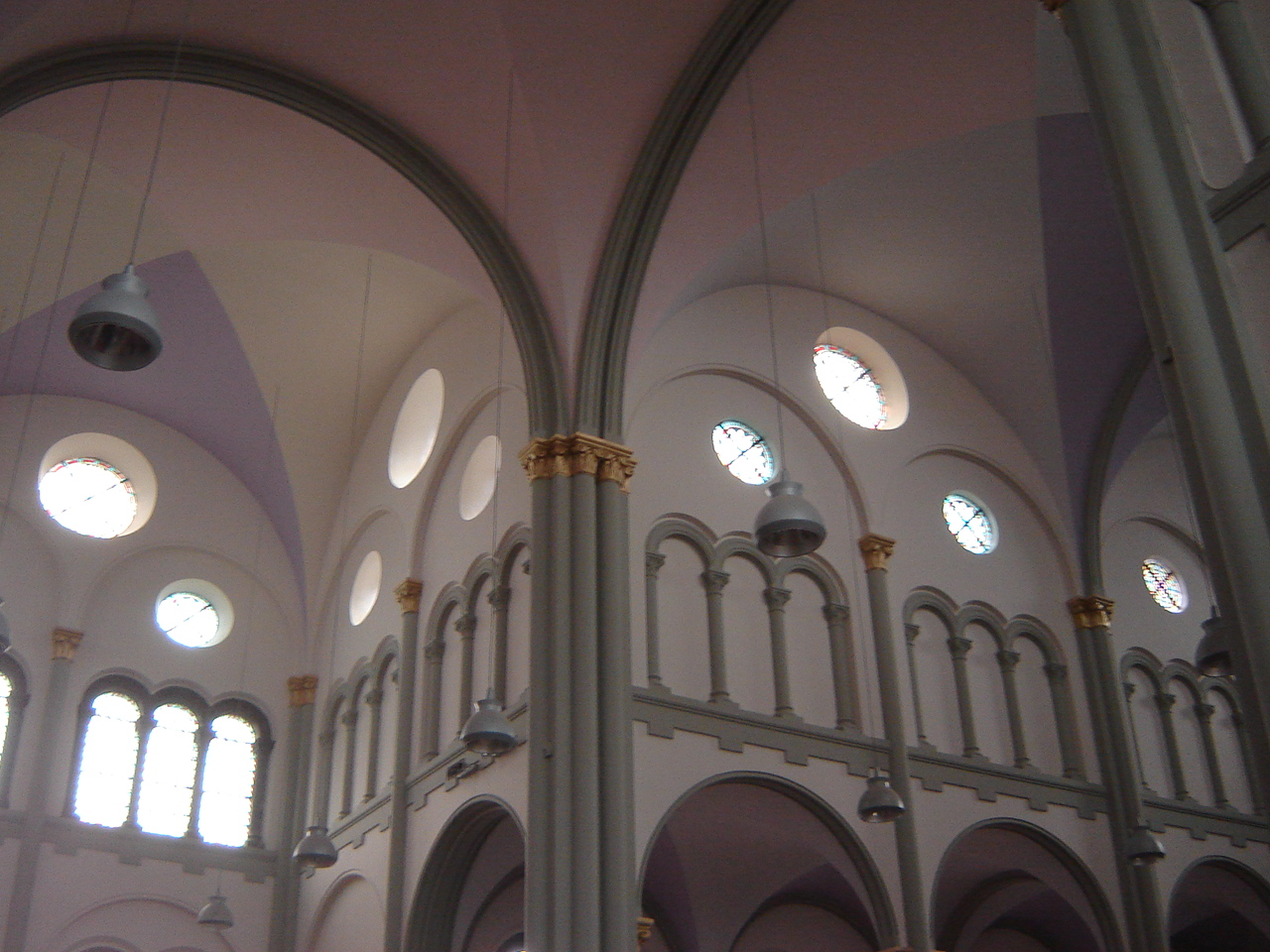
Interior

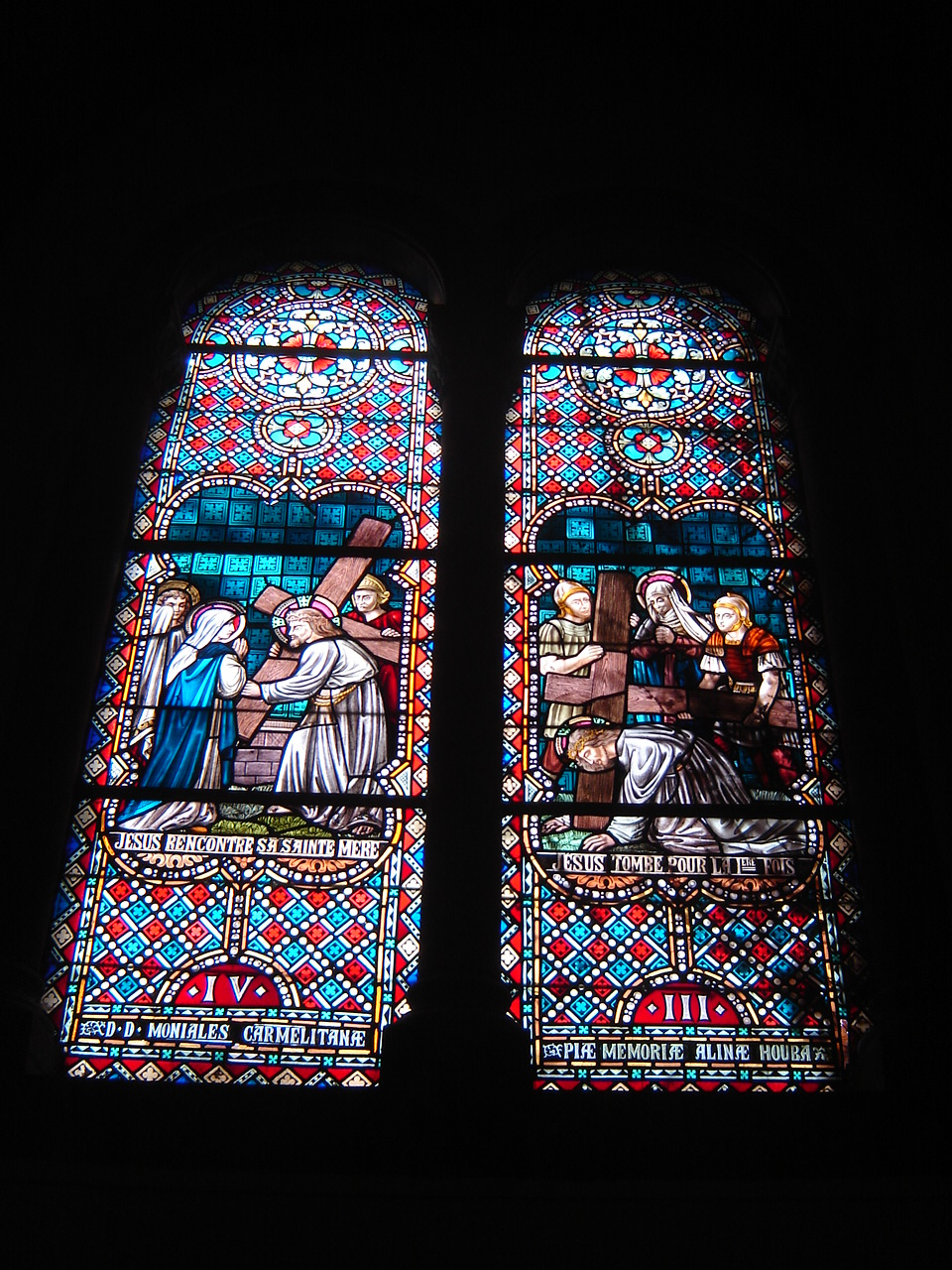
Stained glass

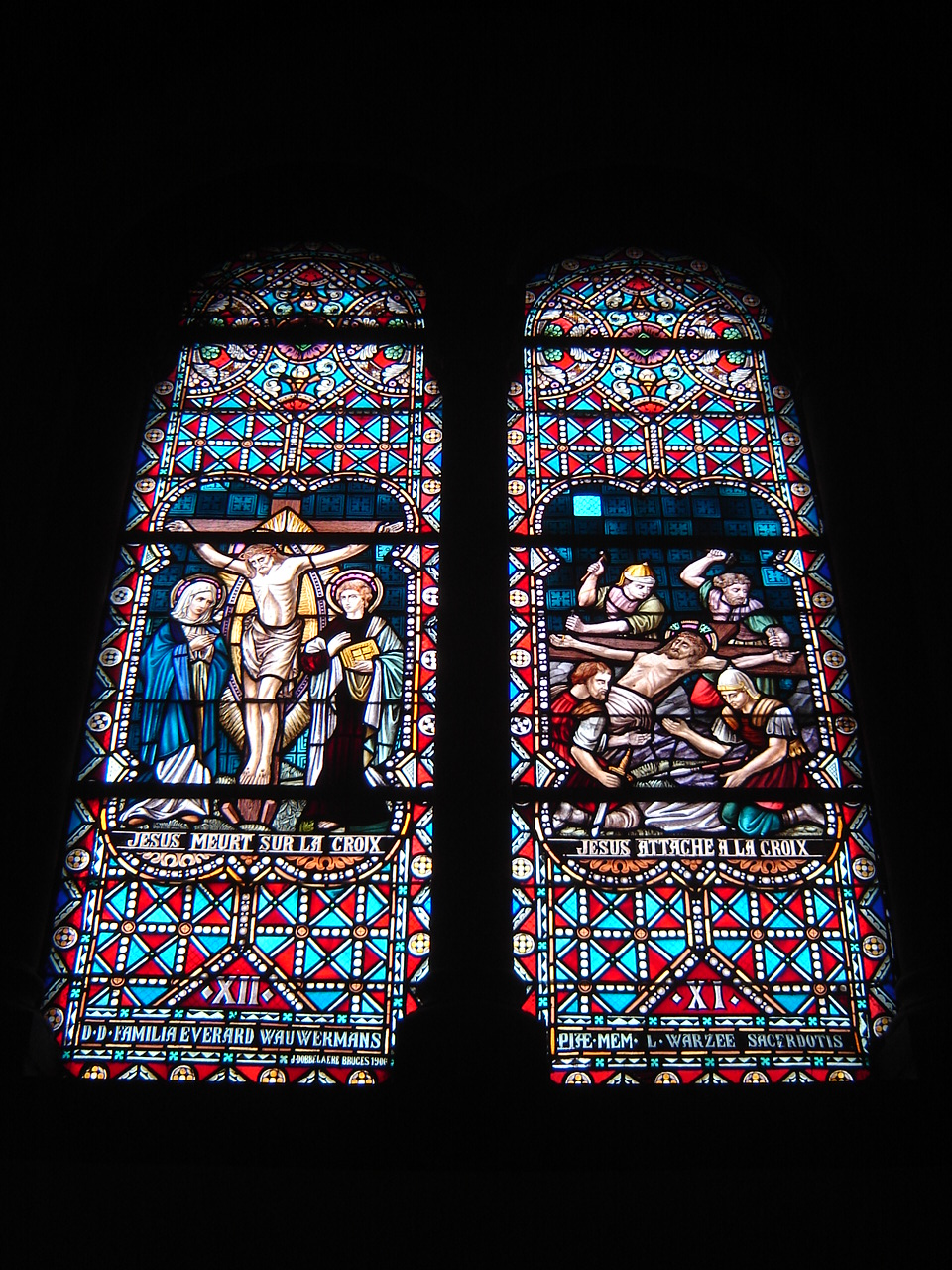
Stained glass

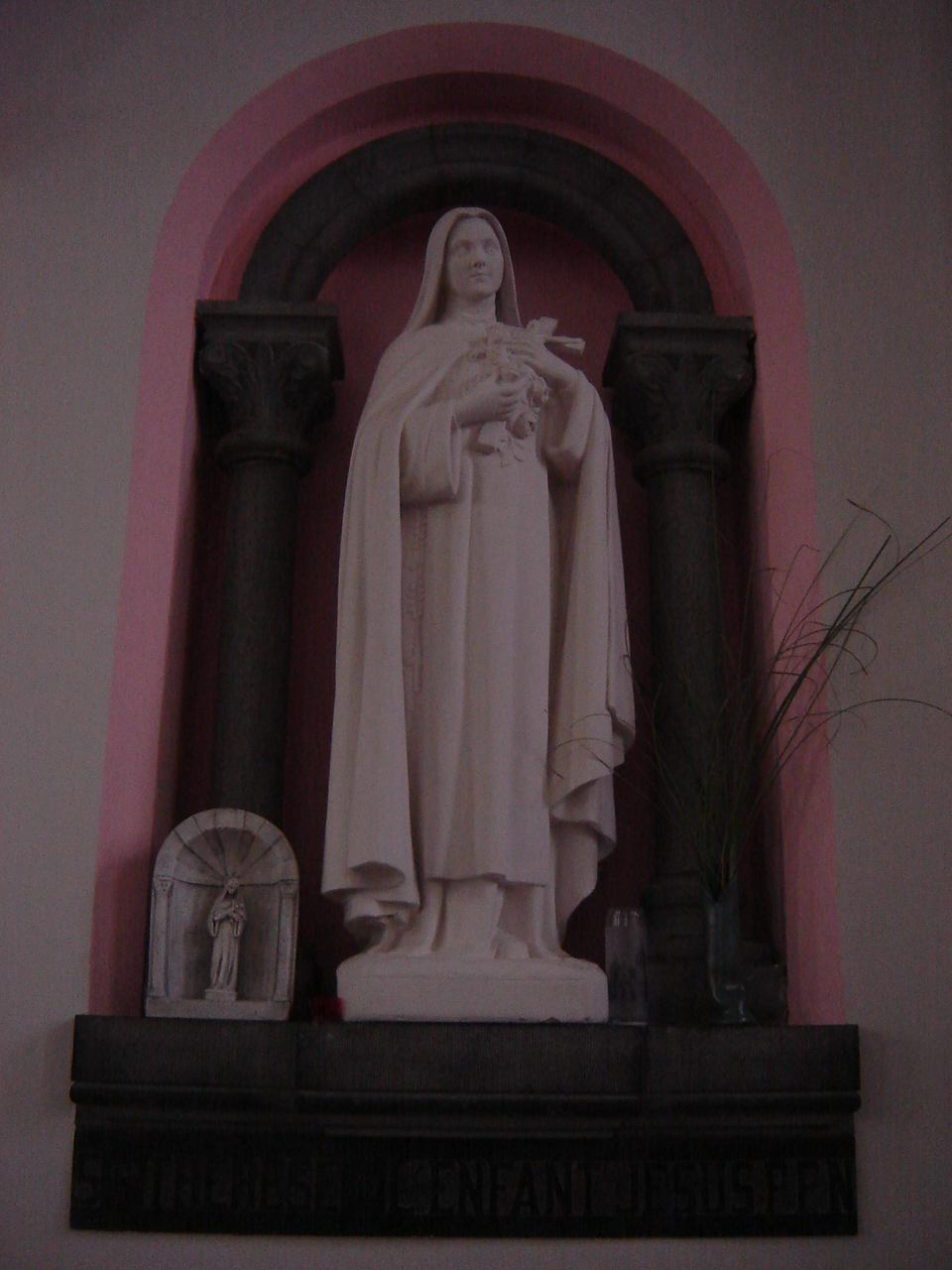
Statue of Thérèse de Lisieux
