= Wavreille =

Wavreille Wavreye (Walloon)
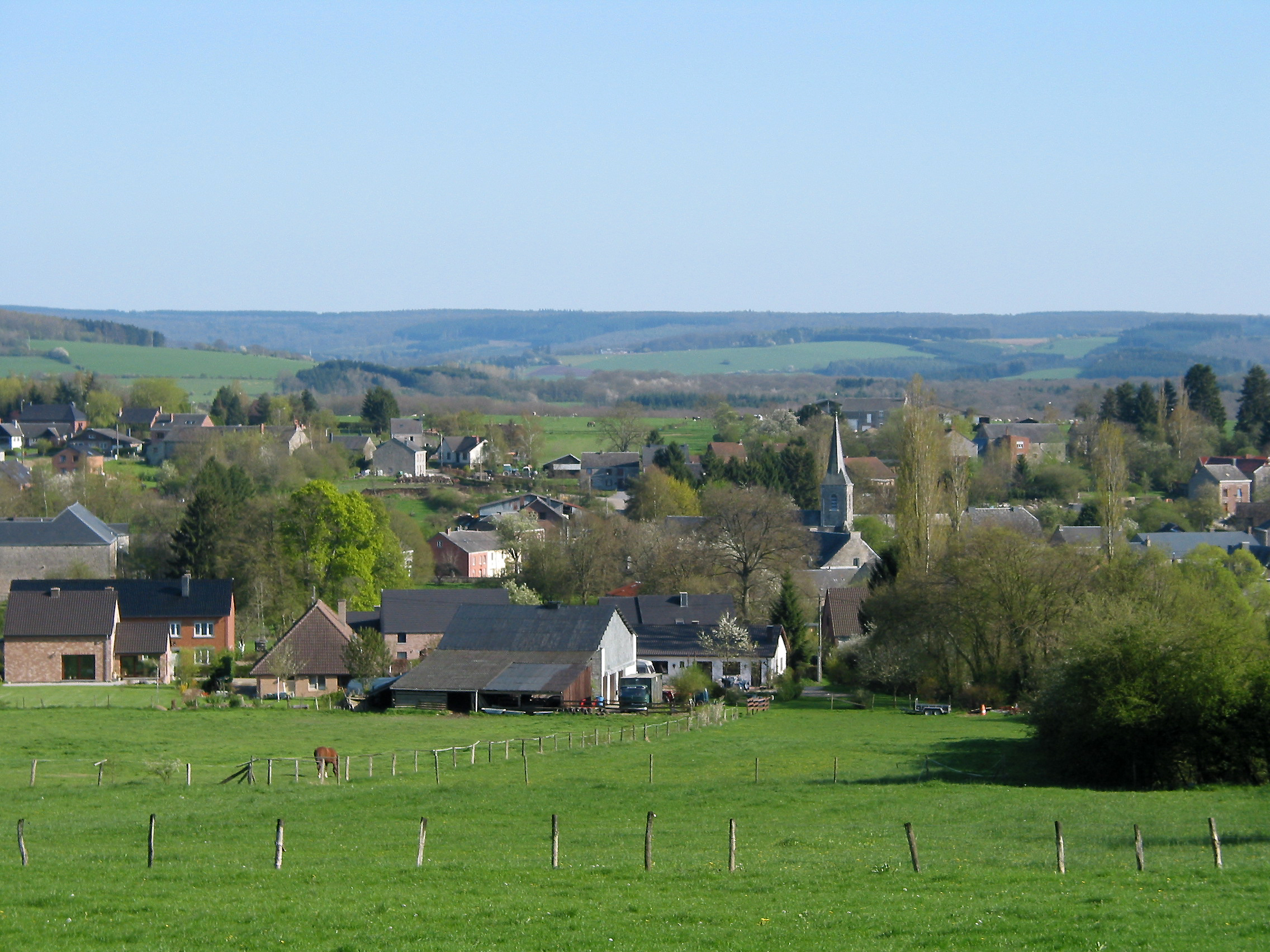
- Wavreille

- Location within Belgium Location within Europe
- Coordinates: 50°07′15″N 05°14′56″E
- Country: Belgium
- Region: Wallonia
- Province: Namur
- Municipality: Rochefort

Wavreille (French pronunciation: [wavʁɛj]; Walloon: Wavreye) is a village of Wallonia and a district of the municipality of Rochefort, located in the province of Namur, Belgium.
