= Lomme (river) =

Coordinates: 50°08′N 5°10′E

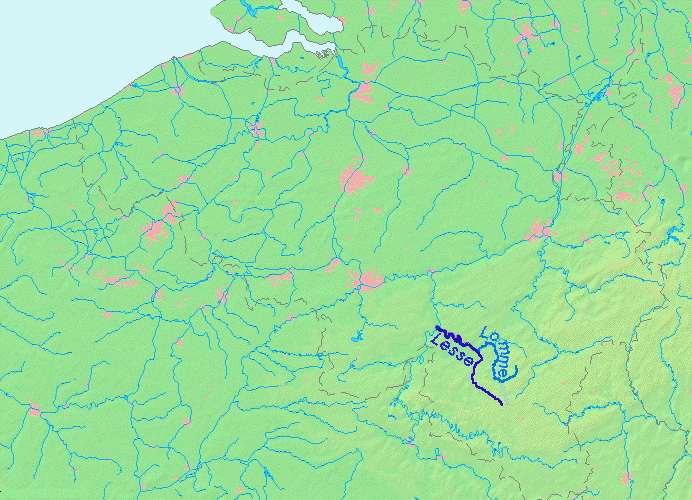
- The Lomme and the Lesse river in Belgium

Location
- Country: Belgium

Physical characteristics
- Source
  - location: Saint-Hubert, Belgium
- Mouth
  - location: Lesse
- Length: 46 km (29 mi)
- Discharge
  - average: 7.4 m^{3}/s (260 cu ft/s)

Basin features
- Progression: Lesse→ Meuse→ North Sea

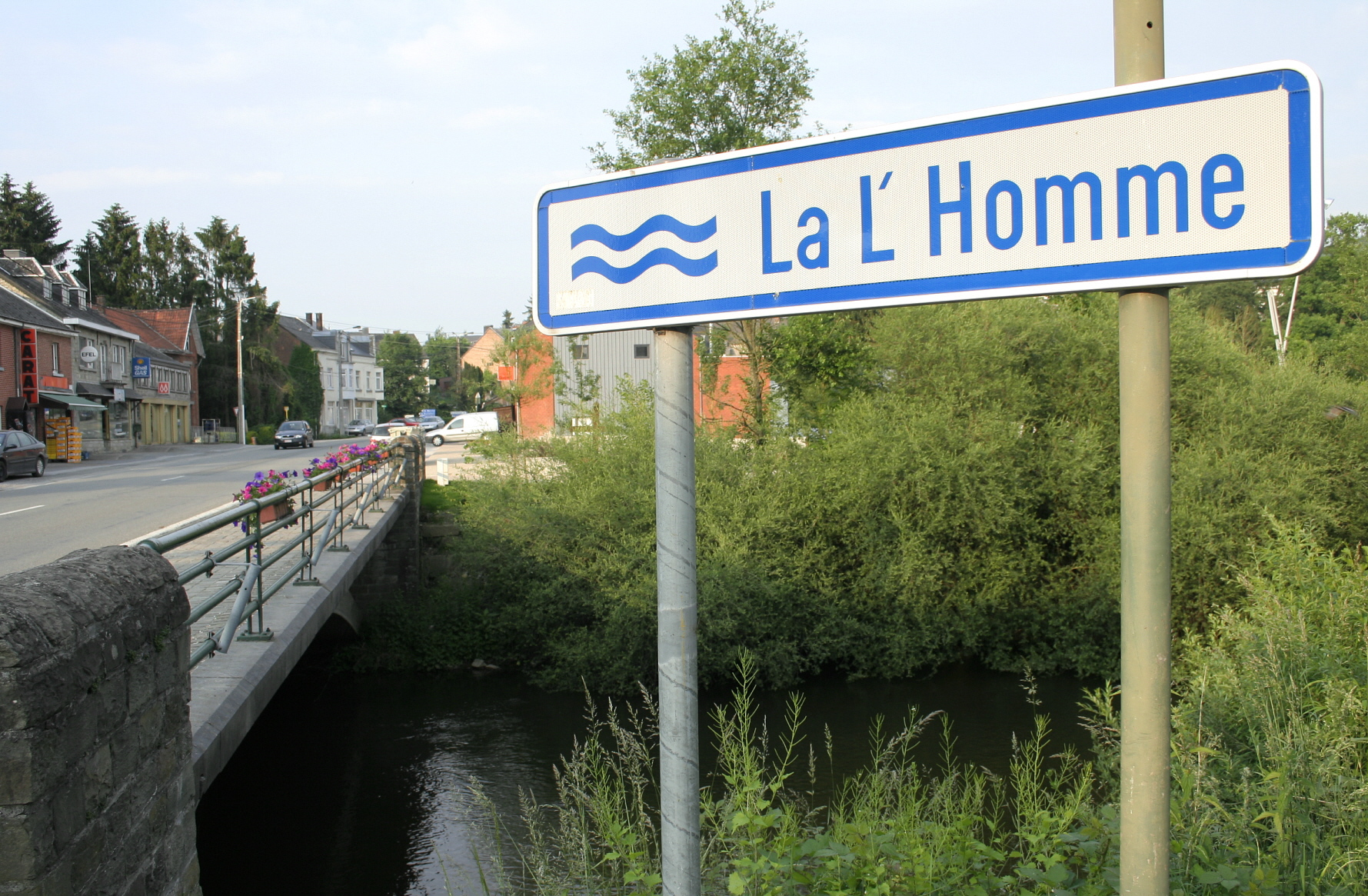
A bridge over the Lomme in the town of Forrières

The Lomme, Lhomme or L'Homme is a river in the Ardennes, in Luxembourg, Belgium. It is a right tributary to the river Lesse, itself a right tributary of the river Meuse.

== Geography ==
Its source is located on the plateau of Saint-Hubert. It passes through the villages of Poix-Saint-Hubert, Smuid, Mirwart, Grupont, Lesterny, Forrières, Jemelle, and the town of Rochefort, where it carves the Lorette cave. It joins the Lesse river at Éprave. The Lomme river is fed by the Lomme river basin, which is made up of predominantly peaty bogs. The Lomme river valley is home to the longest Karst in Belgium.

In 2010 the European Commission began a project to restore the Lomme river basin, in 4 years the project restored 430 hectares of hydrological networks.
