= List of protected heritage sites in Rochefort, Belgium =

This table shows an overview of the protected heritage sites in the Walloon town Rochefort, Belgium. This list is part of Belgium's national heritage.

Object	Year/architect	Town/section	Address	Coordinates	Number^{?}	Image
Park of the old Hôtel des Roches ^{(nl)} ^{(fr)}		Rochefort		50.161426°N 5.223650°E	91114-CLT-0001-01 Info	
Whole of the house "Jacquet" ^{(nl)} ^{(fr)}		Rochefort	rue Jacquet, n° 76	50.155198°N 5.221974°E	91114-CLT-0002-01 Info	
The Calvary Chapel of Lorette and the Holy Sepulchre, and the ensemble of these buildings, their immediate surroundings and the avenue of lime trees there ^{(nl)} ^{(fr)}		Rochefort		50.155181°N 5.227906°E	91114-CLT-0005-01 Info	
The road lined with 49 lime trees is an extension of the classification of the Lorette Chapel, the Calvary and the Holy Sepulchre and the ensemble of these buildings, their immediate surroundings and the avenue of lime trees ^{(nl)} ^{(fr)}		Rochefort		50.154367°N 5.222539°E	91114-CLT-0006-01 Info	
Ruins of the castle of Rochefort ^{(nl)} ^{(fr)}		Rochefort		50.154965°N 5.220613°E	91114-CLT-0007-01 Info	Ruïnes van het kasteel van Rochefort
The towers, ramparts and walls of the ancient castle of Rochefort and the ensemble of the ruins of the old castle, the gardens around it, the walls and the castle with modern extensions ^{(nl)} ^{(fr)}		Rochefort		50.156036°N 5.220841°E	91114-CLT-0008-01 Info	
Ensemble of the marble quarry Saint-Remy ^{(nl)} ^{(fr)}		Rochefort		50.186596°N 5.228869°E	91114-CLT-0009-01 Info	
Plot of land to expand the site of the marble quarry Saint-Remy ^{(nl)} ^{(fr)}		Rochefort		50.186998°N 5.228052°E	91114-CLT-0010-01 Info	
Building: walls and roofs ^{(nl)} ^{(fr)}		Rochefort	rue des Tanneries n° 6	50.161774°N 5.219865°E	91114-CLT-0011-01 Info	
Facades, roofs and fences on the site for the house, and the ensemble of the house, fence, sidewalk and pavement of the road ^{(nl)} ^{(fr)}		Rochefort	rue de Behogne n° 46, Rochefort	50.161168°N 5.222748°E	91114-CLT-0012-01 Info	
Square Francois Crepin ^{(nl)} ^{(fr)}		Rochefort		50.157716°N 5.220429°E	91114-CLT-0013-01 Info	
Ancient oak tree ^{(nl)} ^{(fr)}		Rochefort		50.144172°N 5.215386°E	91114-CLT-0014-01 Info	
Site called "Laide Fosse" ^{(nl)} ^{(fr)}		Rochefort		50.139315°N 5.202509°E	91114-CLT-0015-01 Info	
House: walls, gable end roofs ^{(nl)} ^{(fr)}		Rochefort	rue Jacquet n° 99	50.153839°N 5.220830°E	91114-CLT-0016-01 Info	
Tower of the old city walls ^{(nl)} ^{(fr)}		Rochefort	place Lafayette, achterzijde huis aan rue Jacquet n°99	50.153748°N 5.221035°E	91114-CLT-0017-01 Info	
House: facade of the ground floor and first floor, except for the roofs ^{(nl)} ^{(fr)}		Rochefort	rue Jacquet n° 77	50.154520°N 5.221336°E	91114-CLT-0019-01 Info	
Ancient fortification "Tienne de la Roche" ^{(nl)} ^{(fr)}		Rochefort		50.138952°N 5.175679°E	91114-CLT-0020-01 Info	
Remains of a fort called "Vieux Château" ^{(nl)} ^{(fr)}		Rochefort		50.155788°N 5.239433°E	91114-CLT-0021-01 Info	
Church of Saint-Michel and the wall of the cemetery and the ensemble of the building, the linden trees, the cemetery and the square ^{(nl)} ^{(fr)}		Rochefort		50.108626°N 5.142469°E	91114-CLT-0022-01 Info	
Chapel of Saint-Lambert and the ensemble of the chapel, the two lime trees and the surrounding area ^{(nl)} ^{(fr)}		Rochefort		50.112427°N 5.167431°E	91114-CLT-0023-01 Info	
Chapel of Saint-Remy ^{(nl)} ^{(fr)}		Rochefort		50.143529°N 5.213763°E	91114-CLT-0024-01 Info	Kapel Saint-Remy
Chapel of Saint-Barthélemy ^{(nl)} ^{(fr)}		Rochefort		50.162964°N 5.121902°E	91114-CLT-0026-01 Info	
Château de Lavaux-Sainte-Anne ^{(nl)} ^{(fr)}		Rochefort		50.116043°N 5.091561°E	91114-CLT-0027-01 Info	Kasteel van Lavaux-Sainte-Anne
Farm adjacent to castle of Lavaux-Sainte-Anne ^{(nl)} ^{(fr)}		Rochefort		50.115763°N 5.091968°E	91114-CLT-0028-01 Info	
Ensemble of the remains of the Roman Villa, called "Malagne" or "Chateau Neuf", and the outbuildings and the land of stones called, near the villa ^{(nl)} ^{(fr)}		Rochefort		50.161301°N 5.239005°E	91114-CLT-0029-01 Info	
Remains of the main building of the Gallo-Roman villa of Malagne ^{(nl)} ^{(fr)}		Rochefort		50.162131°N 5.243330°E	91114-CLT-0030-01 Info	
House: walls and roofs ^{(nl)} ^{(fr)}		Rochefort	rue Jacquet n° 96	50.154306°N 5.220646°E	91114-CLT-0031-01 Info	
Chapel of Genimont and its surroundings ^{(nl)} ^{(fr)}		Rochefort		50.121065°N 5.112152°E	91114-CLT-0032-01 Info	
Viewpoint of Forzée ^{(nl)} ^{(fr)}		Rochefort		50.228713°N 5.179135°E	91114-CLT-0033-01 Info	
Old mill Lessive: facades, roofs, machinery, parts of masonry, and the alluvial plain of the Lesse from the dam downstream ^{(nl)} ^{(fr)}		Rochefort		50.143117°N 5.145660°E	91114-CLT-0034-01 Info	
Farm Cavillot: facades and roofs, and the ensemble of the farm and surrounding area ^{(nl)} ^{(fr)}		Rochefort	rue du Jardinia n° 13, Génimont	50.119758°N 5.110842°E	91114-CLT-0035-01 Info	
Chapel of Saint-Nicolas, called Reine Astrid, and the ensemble of the building and surrounding area ^{(nl)} ^{(fr)}		Rochefort		50.177763°N 5.148070°E	91114-CLT-0036-01 Info	
Cave "Le Trou Maulin" and a place called Beauregard ^{(nl)} ^{(fr)}		Rochefort		50.156536°N 5.224480°E	91114-CLT-0037-01 Info	
Pond of the village Wavreille ^{(nl)} ^{(fr)}		Rochefort		50.123118°N 5.246333°E	91114-CLT-0038-01 Info	
Expansion at the site of the pond in the village Wavreille ^{(nl)} ^{(fr)}		Rochefort		50.123363°N 5.245978°E	91114-CLT-0039-01 Info	
Avenue of chestnut trees for the output of the Han-sur-Lesse ^{(nl)} ^{(fr)}		Rochefort		50.122233°N 5.189125°E	91114-CLT-0040-01 Info	
Ensemble of l'Anticlinal and common areas of both sides of the Cluse Ry d'Ave ^{(nl)} ^{(fr)}		Rochefort	Han-sur-Lesse	50.117419°N 5.173572°E	91114-CLT-0041-01 Info	
Site called "Belvedere" or "Rochers de Serin" ^{(nl)} ^{(fr)}		Rochefort		50.133537°N 5.194555°E	91114-CLT-0042-01 Info	
Stone bridge over the Wimbe, and the ensemble of the bridge near the castle and the farm ^{(nl)} ^{(fr)}		Rochefort		50.115779°N 5.092966°E	91114-CLT-0043-01 Info	
Facades and roofs (except synthetic part) of the 18th century farm located near the farm of the castle of Lavaux-Sainte-Anne, excluding the construction of the 19th century and a circumference of four land parcels forming a triangle, posterior of Wimbe and the other two sides of the streets and rue du Château le chemin de Neuville ^{(nl)} ^{(fr)}		Rochefort		50.115380°N 5.092940°E	91114-CLT-0044-01 Info	
Grassland or heathland "Tienne Moseray" ^{(nl)} ^{(fr)}		Rochefort		50.099170°N 5.170209°E	91114-CLT-0048-01 Info	
Château de Lavaux-Sainte-Anne ^{(nl)} ^{(fr)}		Rochefort		50.116043°N 5.091561°E	91114-PEX-0001-01 Info	
Ensemble of the common areas on both sides of the Cluse Ry d'Ave ^{(nl)} ^{(fr)}		Rochefort	Han-sur-Lesse	50.117419°N 5.173572°E	91114-PEX-0002-01 Info	

== See also ==
- List of protected heritage sites in Namur (province)
- Rochefort, Belgium
