= Château de Lavaux-Sainte-Anne =

Castle in modern day Belgium

Coordinates: 50.116055°N 5.091574°E

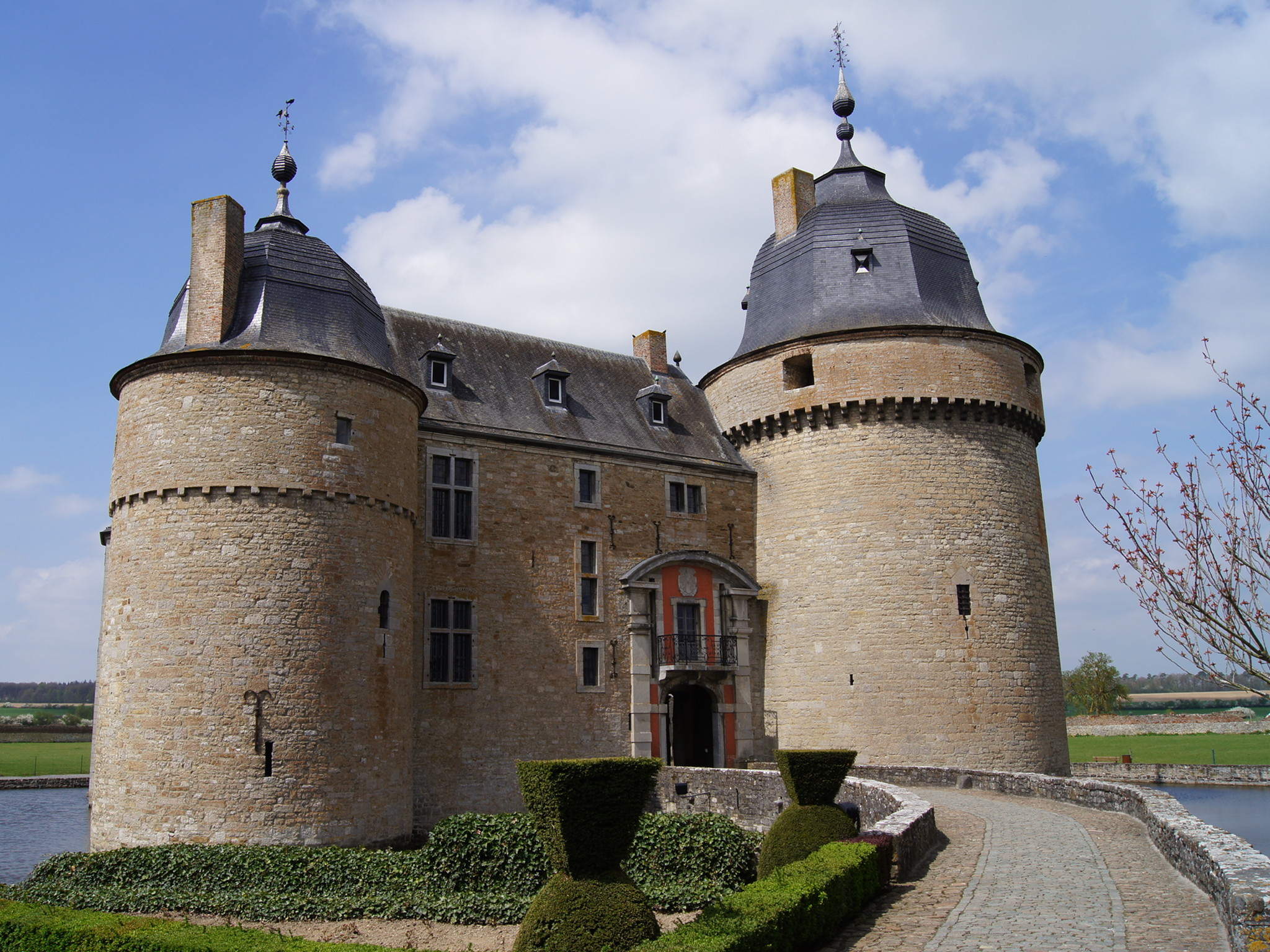
View of the main entrance to the Château de Lavaux-Sainte-Anne

The Castle of Lavaux-Sainte-Anne (French: Château de Lavaux-Sainte-Anne) is a castle located in Wallonia near Rochefort, Province of Namur in Belgium. In 1450, Jean II de Berlo commissioned the building of the castle.

On 16 November 2002, famous tennis player Justine Henin married Pierre-Yves Hardenne in this castle.

== Origins ==
About a hundred meters from the castle passed a secondary Roman road. It came from Givet towards Ave-et-Auffe, passing through Lavaux. Nearby were the village of Genimont and the Roman fort of Eprave. In medieval times, the creation of the Principality of Liège made the region of Lavaux a border area with the Duchy of Luxembourg. This border is protected by the forts of Agimont, Revogne, Lavaux and Rochefort. The lords of the time are of the "Wellin" family. The first known mention of Lavaux dates from 1244.

== The wars of the 15th century ==
Jean II de Berlo, lord of Lavaux, was the builder of the castle around 1450. In 1456, Louis of Bourbon, nephew of Philip, Duke of Burgundy, became prince-bishop of Liège. The animosity and distrust of the towns of Liège against the Duke of Burgundy grew and armed bands roamed the country which was no longer safe. Jean de Berlo, Lord Lavaux, who had initially accepted a treaty of neutrality with the town of Dinant (1462), chose to align himself with the prince in his fight against the rebels of the Liège region. Duke Philippe sent armed men to defend Lavaux. In 1463, he confronted Dinant and reinforced the castle of Lavaux with the latest military advances to resist any enemy attack. After fights that caused great destruction in the region, Jean de Berlo escaped to the court of Louis of Bourbon. In Famenne, disorder and insecurity grow. Erard de La Marck, enemy of the House of Burgundy, razes the lands of Jean de Berlo with the men-at-arms of Liège. In August 1468, the Duke of Burgundy proclaims himself Lord of Revogne and Dinant.

The peace imposed by his son, Charles the Bold, establishes that no castles destroyed during the war in the territory of the principality could be rebuilt except those of the bishop's supporters, including those of Jean de Berlo. Hardly recovered from terrible fights with the house of Burgundy, the country of Liège suffers a civil war. William de la Marck, supported by the king of France, started in 1482 a war in which Jean de Berlo would meet his death near the source of Basse-Wez (Liège). At the end of the 15th century, the castle is no longer inhabited by its owners; only Berlo's widow, since 1482, ended her days in the half-ruined fortress.

== See also ==
- List of castles in Belgium
