= Éprave =

Éprave Epråve (Walloon)
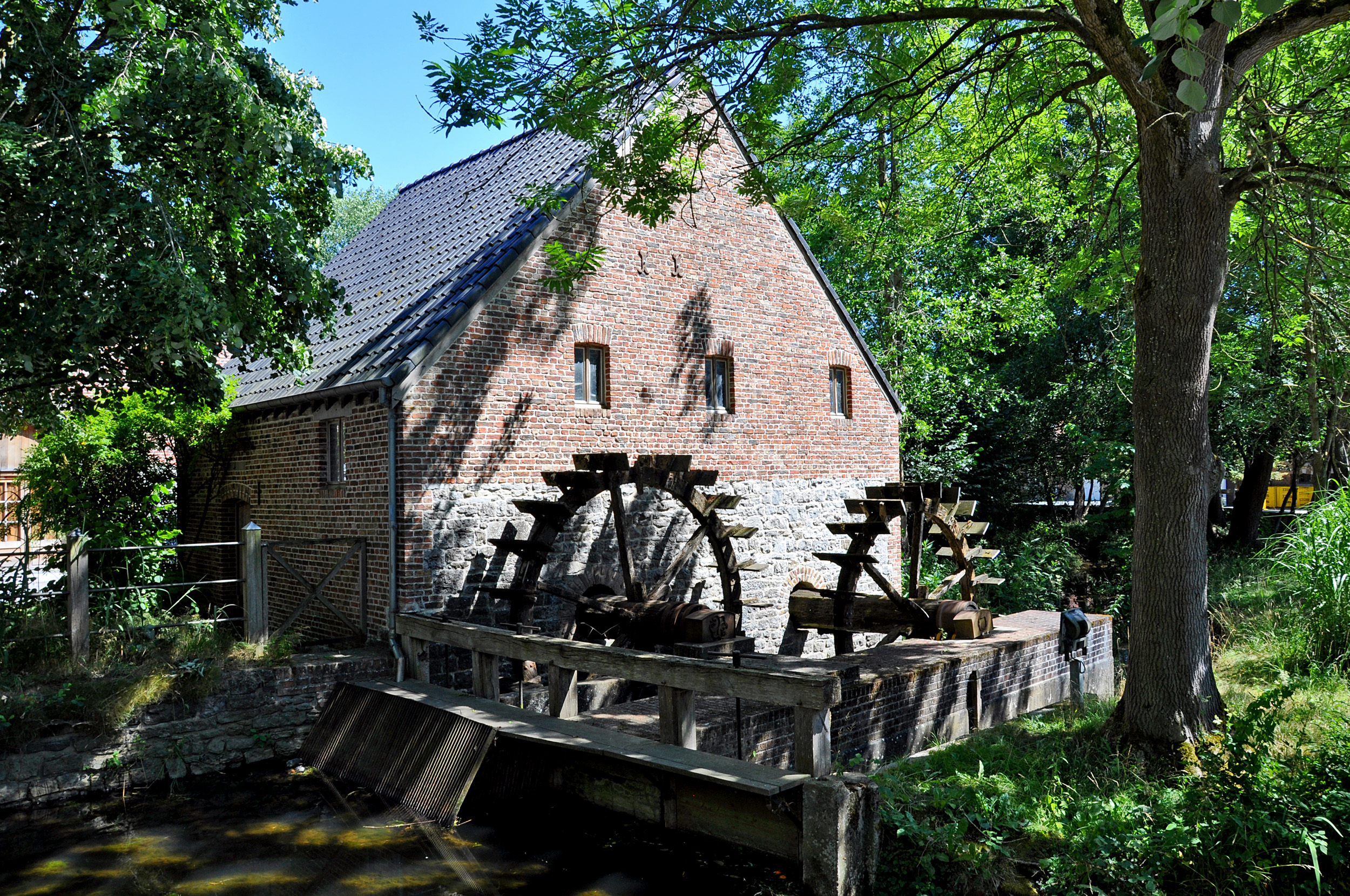
- Éprave, the watermill

- Location within Belgium Location within Europe
- Coordinates: 50°08′35″N 05°09′51″E
- Country: Belgium
- Region: Wallonia
- Province: Namur
- Municipality: Rochefort

Éprave (French pronunciation: [epʁav]; Walloon: Epråve) is a village of Wallonia and a district of the municipality of Rochefort, located in the province of Namur, Belgium.

Éprave was settled already during the third century in the form of an oppidum, the remains of which are still visible in the village. During the Middle Ages, the village was part of the domain of the Prince-Bishopric of Liège. From 1610, it passed to the counts of Rochefort The village watermill has also traditionally functioned as a beer brewery and dates back to the 15th century.
