= Wellin =

Municipality in Wallonia, Belgium

Wellin Welin (Walloon)
- Municipality
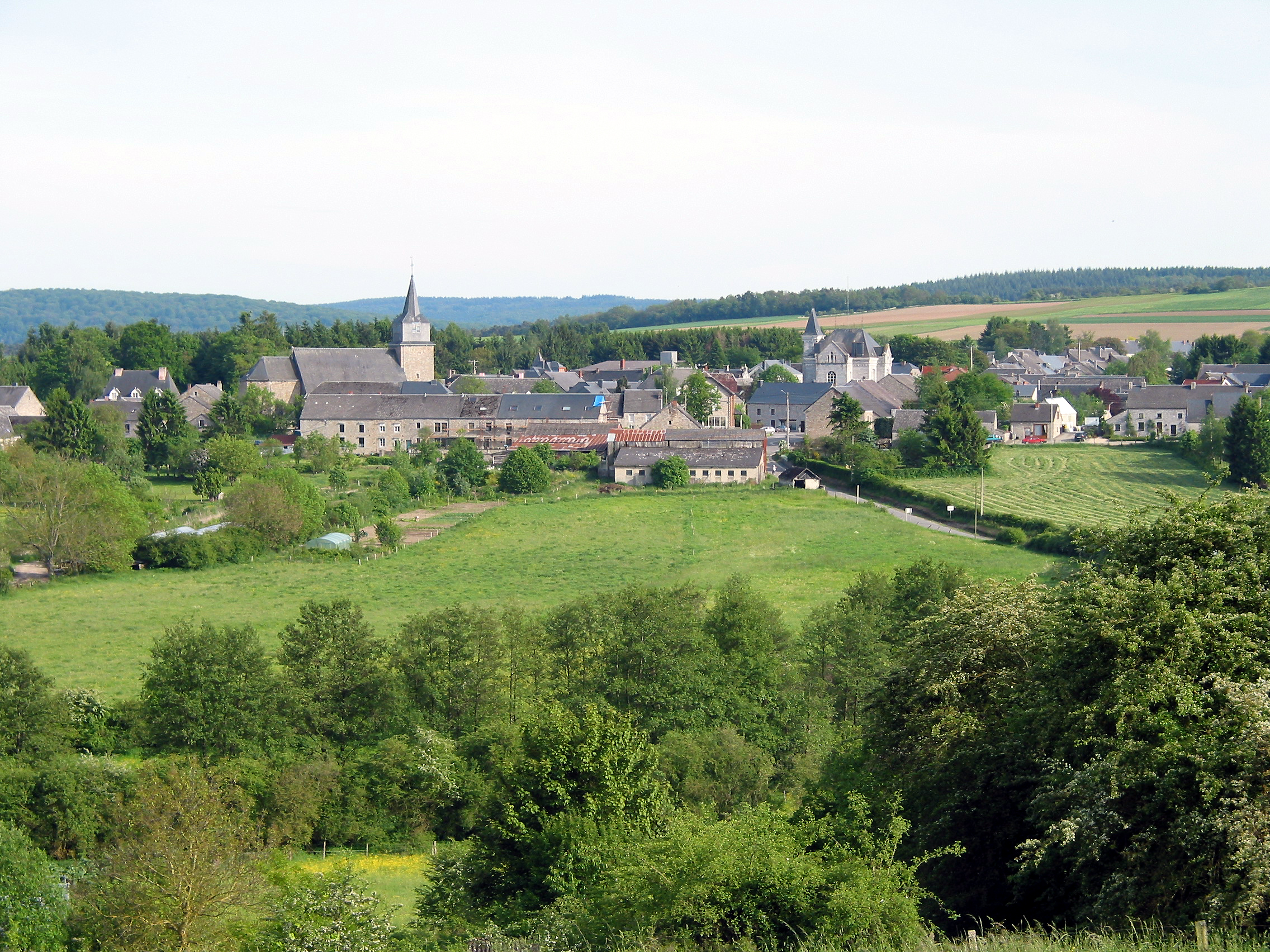

- Coat of arms

- Location of Wellin in Luxembourg province
- Interactive map of Wellin
- Location in Belgium
- Coordinates: 50°4.9′N 5°6.8′E
- Country: Belgium
- Community: French Community
- Region: Wallonia
- Province: Luxembourg
- Arrondissement: Neufchâteau

Government
  - Mayor: Benoît Closson
  - Governing party: Wellin dem@in

Area
  - Total: 67.86 km^{2} (26.20 sq mi)

Population (2018-01-01)
  - Total: 3,064
  - Density: 45.15/km^{2} (116.9/sq mi)
- Postal codes: 6920-6922, 6924
- NIS code: 84075
- Area codes: 084
- Website: wellin.be

Wellin (French pronunciation: [wɛlɛ̃]; Walloon: Welin) is a municipality of Wallonia located in the province of Luxembourg, Belgium.

On 1 January 2007 the municipality, which covers 67.52 km^{2} (26.07 sq mi), had 2,958 inhabitants, giving a population density of 43.8 inhabitants per km^{2}.

The municipality consists of the following districts: Chanly, Halma, Lomprez, Sohier, and Wellin. Other population centers include: Barzin, Froidlieu, Fays-Famenne, and Neupont.
