= Tourism in Belgium =

Tourism in Belgium is one of Belgium's industries. Its accessibility from elsewhere in Europe makes it a popular tourist destination. The tourist industry generates 2.8% of Belgium's gross domestic product and employs 3.3% of the working population (142,000 people). 6.7 million people travelled to Belgium in 2005. Two-thirds of them come from the larger nearby countries - France, The Netherlands, the United Kingdom, and Germany; there are also many tourists from Spain and Italy.

Like many national institutions in Belgium, the national tourist agencies are split along regional lines with two tourist agencies. They are the Belgian Tourist Office Brussels & Wallonia for the regions of Wallonia and Brussels Capital-Region, and Toerisme Vlaanderen covering Flanders, although it covers Brussels as well.

In 1993, 2% of the total workforce was employed in tourism, less than in many neighbouring countries. Much of the tourism industry is located either on the heavily developed coastline or in the Ardennes. Brussels and the Flemish cities of Bruges, Ghent, Antwerp, Leuven, and Mechelen, the Flemish Cities of Art, attract many cultural tourists. Much tourism in Brussels is business tourism.

Yearly tourist arrivals in millions

Belgium was ranked 21st on the World Economic Forum's 2017 Travel and Tourism Competitiveness report. The country was placed 4th for "health and hygiene" and 6th for "ground and port infrastructure", but only 105th in the world for "price competitiveness" and 122nd for "natural resources". In recent years, the number of international tourists has exponentially grown as key figures shown by Tourisme Vlaanderen.

== Arrivals by country ==
Most visitors arriving to Belgium on short-term basis in come from the following countries of nationality:

Rank	Country	2014	2015	2016
1	The Netherlands	1,705,537	1,919,413	1,854,486
2	France	1,264,291	1,285,610	1,202,041
3	United Kingdom	1,026,003	1,043,613	868,173
4	Germany	868,250	945,974	865,031
5	Spain	366,474	360,220	304,598
6	United States	366,061	388,423	299,907
7	Italy	299,864	294,945	224,762
8	China	169,075	209,045	147,654
9	Luxembourg	100,002	114,899	110,953
10	Switzerland	108,031	118,796	91,308
11	Poland	87,698	94,937	90,914
12	Sweden	69,994	68,021	65,117
13	Denmark	60,330	61,927	63,415
14	Russia	97,183	72,630	60,386
15	Ireland	N/A	N/A	57,266
16	Turkey	49,475	61,538	55,410
17	Portugal	N/A	N/A	54,221
18	Canada	59,289	61,357	50,521
19	Japan	111,939	96,444	50,253
20	Romania	N/A	N/A	45,077
	Total foreign	7,887,426	8,354,753	7,481,422

== See also ==
- List of museums in Belgium
- Europalia
