= Lesse =

Coordinates: 50°14′N 4°54′E

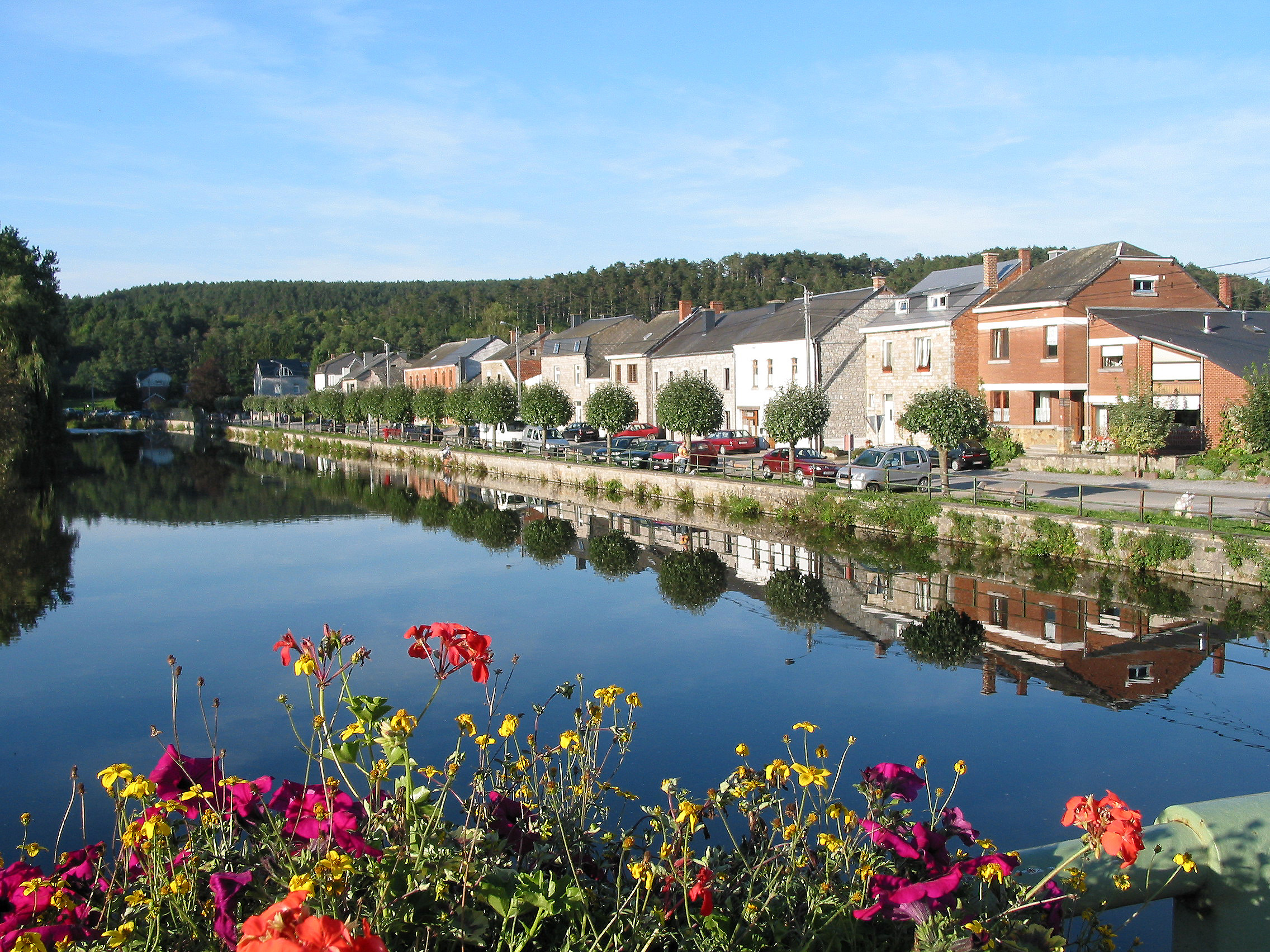
- The Lesse in Han-sur-Lesse.

Location
- Country: Belgium

Physical characteristics
- Source
  - location: Ardennes
  - elevation: 480 m (1,570 ft)
- Mouth
  - location: Meuse
- Length: 89 km (55 mi)

Basin features
- Progression: Meuse→ North Sea

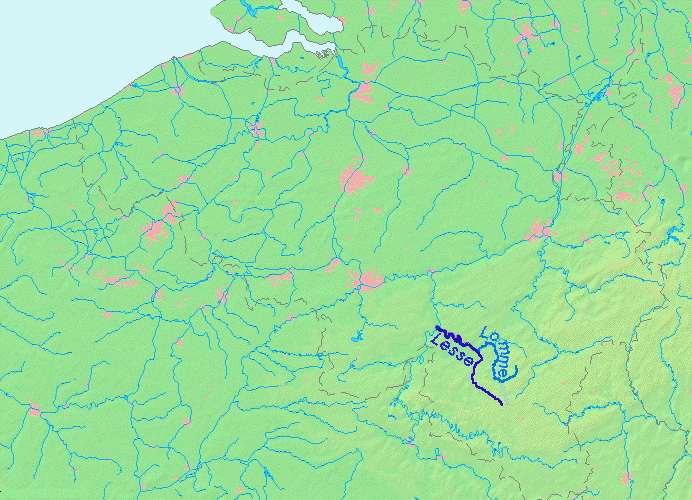
The Lesse and its tributary the Lomme in Belgium

The Lesse is a river in the Ardennes, in the Walloon region of Belgium. It is a right tributary to the river Meuse.

The source of the Lesse is near Libramont-Chevigny, in the Belgian province of Luxembourg. The Lesse flows roughly in north-western direction. It is only 49 miles (79 km) long, but its meandering course may be judged by the fact that it is no more than 29 miles (47 km) from its source to Anseremme in a straight line. It has 13 tributaries in its short course.

Near Han-sur-Lesse (municipality of Rochefort) the entire river goes underground, flowing through limestone caves. Many of the caves along the banks of the Lesse are important archaeological sites; these include the Trou de Chaleux (by the Cirque de Chaleux), and the Trou des Nutons and Trou du Frontal at Furfooz.

The Lesse flows into the river Meuse in the village of Anseremme, municipality of Dinant. Towns along the Lesse are Daverdisse, Han-sur-Lesse, Houyet and Anseremme.
