= 6th Airborne Division order of battle =

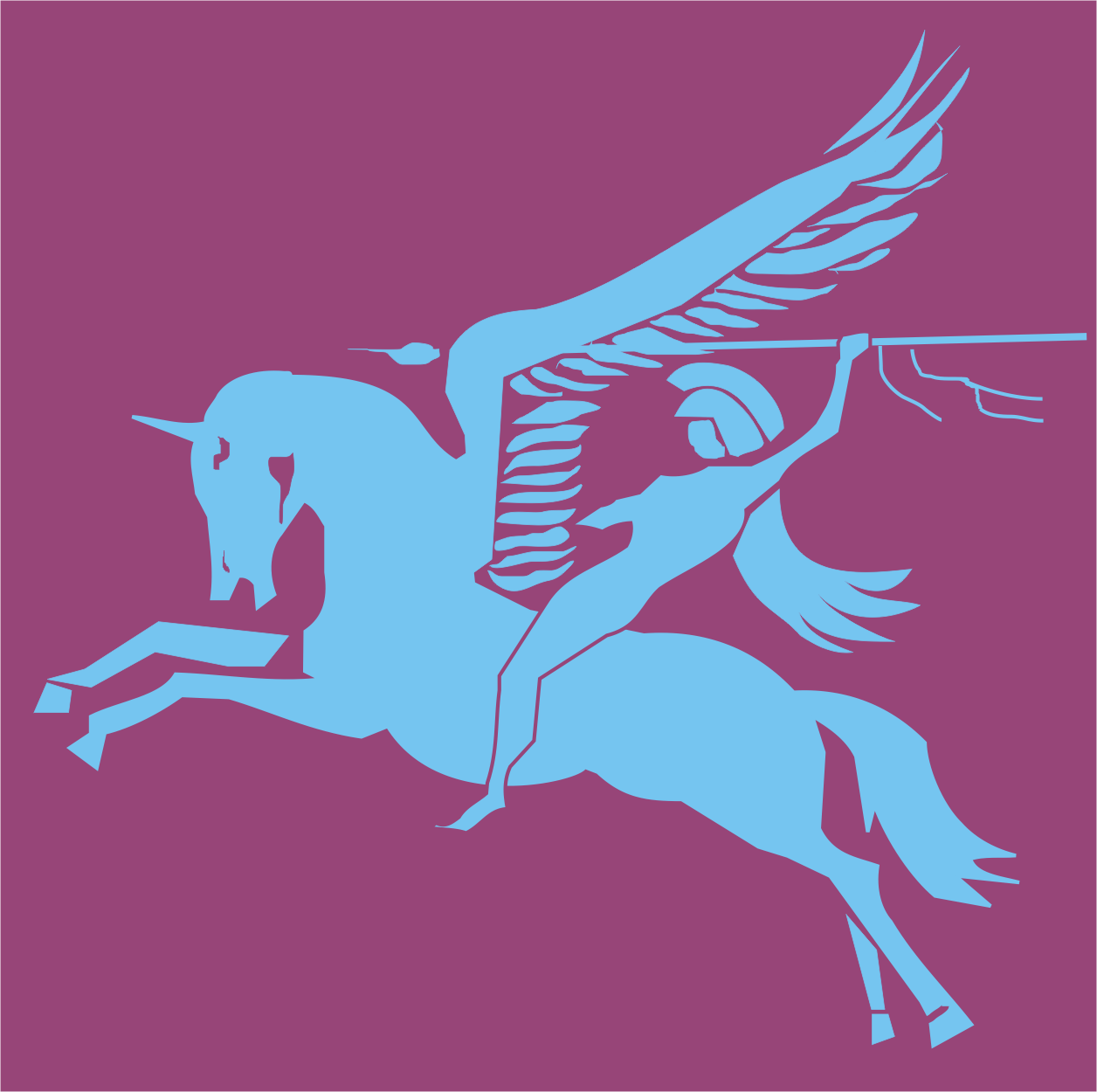
The emblem of the Second World War British Airborne Forces, Bellerophon riding the flying horse Pegasus.

The 6th Airborne Division order of battle lists only those units assigned to the division; units attached only for short periods of time are not included.

The 6th Airborne Division was the second of two airborne divisions formed by the British Army during the Second World War. Raised in 1943, the division fought in the Normandy landings (Capture of the Caen canal and Orne river bridges, Operation Tonga, Operation Mallard, Battle of Breville), the Battle of the Bulge in December 1944 and January 1945. The division then participated in Operation Varsity, the second airborne assault over the River Rhine during the war. Afterwards the division advanced north to the Baltic Sea, reaching Wismar by the end of the war.

In the immediate post war period the 1st Airborne Division was disbanded leaving the 6th as the only airborne division in the British Army. Near the end of 1945, the division was named the Imperial Strategic Reserve and posted to the Middle East and deployed in an internal security role, during unrest in the British mandate of Palestine. By 1948, the British Army numbers had returned to peace time levels and the division was disbanded leaving the independent 2nd Parachute Brigade as the only regular army airborne formation.

== Order of battle ==
=== Second World War ===
The Second World War formation, that participated in the Normandy landings, and Rhine Crossing.

- 3rd Parachute Brigade
  - 8th (Midlands) Parachute Battalion
  - 9th (Eastern and Home Counties) Parachute Battalion
  - 1st Canadian Parachute Battalion
- 5th Parachute Brigade
  - 7th (Light Infantry) Parachute Battalion
  - 12th (Yorkshire) Parachute Battalion
  - 13th (Lancashire) Parachute Battalion
- 6th Airlanding Brigade
  - 12th Devonshire Regiment
  - 2nd Oxfordshire and Buckinghamshire Light Infantry
  - 1st Royal Ulster Rifles
- Divisional troops
  - 6th Airborne Armoured Reconnaissance Regiment
  - 53rd (Worcester Yeomanry) Airlanding Light Regiment, Royal Artillery
  - 2nd Forward Observer Unit, Royal Artillery
  - 3rd Airlanding Anti-Tank Battery, Royal Artillery
  - 4th Airlanding Anti-Tank Battery, Royal Artillery
  - 2nd Airlanding Light Anti-Aircraft Battery, Royal Artillery
  - 3rd Parachute Squadron, Royal Engineers
  - 591st Parachute Squadron, Royal Engineers
  - 249th Field Company. Royal Engineers
  - 286th Field Park Company, Royal Engineers
  - 6th Airborne Division Postal Unit, Royal Engineers
  - 6th Airborne Divisional Signals
  - 22st Independent Parachute Company (Pathfinders)
  - 127th (Parachute) Field Ambulance
  - 224th (Parachute) Field Ambulance
  - 195th (Airlanding) Field Ambulance
  - 63rd Company, Royal Army Service Corps
  - 398th Company, Royal Army Service Corps
  - 716th Company, Royal Army Service Corps
  - 6th Airborne Division Ordnance Field Park
  - 6th Airborne Division Workshop
  - 6th Airborne Division Provost Company
  - 245 Provost Company, Headquarters, Corps of Military Police (6th Airborne Division)

=== 1946 ===
This represents the division formation on arrival in the Middle East.

- 2nd Parachute Brigade
  - 4th Parachute Battalion
  - 5th (Scottish) Parachute Battalion
  - 6th (Royal Welch) Parachute Battalion
- 3rd Parachute Brigade
  - 3rd Parachute Battalion
  - 8th (Midlands) Parachute Battalion
  - 9th (Eastern and Home Counties) Parachute Battalion
- 6th Airlanding Brigade
  - 2nd Oxfordshire and Buckinghamshire Light Infantry
  - 1st Royal Ulster Rifles
  - 1st Argyll and Sutherland Highlanders
- Divisional troops
  - 6th Airborne Armoured Reconnaissance Regiment
  - 53rd (Worcester Yeomanry) Airlanding Light Regiment
  - 2nd Airlanding Anti-Tank Regiment
  - 2nd Forward Observer Unit
  - 1st Airborne Squadron, Royal Engineers
  - 9th Airborne Squadron, Royal Engineers
  - 286th Airborne Park squadron, Royal Engineers
  - 6th Airborne Division Postal Unit, Royal Engineers
  - 6th Airborne Divisional Signals
  - 21st Independent Parachute Company
  - 63rd Composite Company (Airborne), Royal Army Service Corps
  - 398th Composite Company (Airborne), Royal Army Service Corps
  - 716th Company (Airborne Light), Royal Army Service Corps
  - 127th (Parachute) Field Ambulance
  - 224th (Parachute) Field Ambulance
  - 195th (Airlanding) Field Ambulance
  - 74th Field Hygiene section
  - 6th Airborne Division Ordnance, Field Park Royal Army Ordnance Corps
  - 6th Airborne Division Workshops. Royal Electrical and Mechanical Engineers
  - 6th Airborne Division Battle School
  - 6th Airborne Division Training School
  - 6th Airborne Division Provost Company
  - 317th Field Security Section
  - 16th Field Cash Office (Light)
  - 6th Airborne Division Air Photographic Interpretation Section
  - 2nd Mobile Photographic Enlargement Section

=== 1947 ===
By January 1947, the 6th Airlanding Brigade, the 6th Airborne Armoured Reconnaissance Regiment, the 21st Independent Parachute Company had been disbanded and the 286th Airborne Park Squadron were renumbered the 249th.

- 1st Parachute Brigade
  - 1st Parachute Battalion
  - 2nd Parachute Battalion
  - 17th Parachute Battalion
- 2nd Parachute Brigade
  - 4th Parachute Battalion
  - 5th (Scottish) Parachute Battalion
  - 6th (Royal Welch) Parachute Battalion
- 3rd Parachute Brigade
  - 3rd Parachute Battalion
  - 8th (Midlands) Parachute Battalion
  - 9th (Eastern and Home Counties) Parachute Battalion
- Divisional troops
  - 3rd The King's Own Hussars
  - 53rd (Worcester Yeomanry) Airlanding Light Regiment
  - 2nd Airlanding Anti-Tank Regiment
  - 2nd Forward Observer Unit
  - 1st Airborne Squadron, Royal Engineers
  - 9th Airborne Squadron, Royal Engineers
  - 249th Airborne Park Squadron, Royal Engineers
  - 6th Airborne Division Postal Unit, Royal Engineers
  - 6th Airborne Divisional Signals
  - No. 1 Wing, Glider Pilot Regiment
  - 63rd Composite Company (Airborne), Royal Army Service Corps
  - 398th Composite Company (Airborne), Royal Army Service Corps
  - 716th Company (Airborne Light), Royal Army Service Corps
  - 127th (Parachute) Field Ambulance
  - 224th (Parachute) Field Ambulance
  - 195th (Airlanding) Field Ambulance
  - 74th Field Hygiene section
  - 6th Airborne Division Ordnance, Field Park Royal Army Ordnance Corps
  - 6th Airborne Division Workshops. Royal Electrical and Mechanical Engineers
  - 6th Airborne Division Battle School
  - 6th Airborne Division Training School
  - 6th Airborne Division Provost Company
  - 317th Field Security Section
  - 16th Field Cash Office (Light)
  - 6th Airborne Division Air Photographic Interpretation Section
  - 2nd Mobile Photographic Enlargement Section

=== 1948 ===
The division had been reduced to two parachute brigades and supporting troops, the majority of which served in Palestine, while the 2nd Parachute Brigade was based in England.

- 1st Parachute Brigade
  - 1st Parachute Battalion
  - 2nd/3rd Parachute Battalion
  - 8th/9th Parachute Battalion
- 2nd Parachute Brigade (Based in England)
  - 4th/6th Parachute Battalion
  - 5th (Scottish) Parachute Battalion
  - 7th (Light Infantry) Parachute Battalion
- Divisional troops
  - 3rd The King's Own Hussars
  - 33rd Airborne Light Regiment
  - 66th Airlanding Anti-Tank Regiment
  - 334th Forward Observer Unit
  - 1st Airborne Squadron, Royal Engineers
  - 3rd Airborne Squadron, Royal Engineers (Based in England)
  - 9th Airborne Squadron, Royal Engineers
  - 147th Airborne Park Squadron, Royal Engineers
  - 6th Airborne Division Postal Unit, Royal Engineers
  - 6th Airborne Divisional Signals
  - 63rd Company (Parachute Brigade), Royal Army Service Corps (Based in England)
  - 398th Company (Parachute Brigade), Royal Army Service Corps
  - 716th Company (Parachute Brigade), Royal Army Service Corps
  - 23rd (Parachute) Field Ambulance (Based in England)
  - 195th (Parachute) Field Ambulance
  - 224th (Parachute) Field Ambulance
  - 74th Field Hygiene Section
  - 16th Field Hygiene Section
  - 17th Field Hygiene Section
  - 6th Airborne Division Ordnance Field Park, Royal Army Ordnance Corps
  - 1st Airborne Workshops, Royal Army Ordnance Corps
  - 2nd Airborne Workshops, Royal Army Ordnance Corps (Based in England)
  - 3rd Airborne Workshops, Royal Army Ordnance Corps
  - 6th Airborne Division Battle School
  - 6th Airborne Division Training School
  - 6th Airborne Division Provost Company
  - 317th Field Security Section
  - 16th Field Cash Office (Light)
  - 6th Airborne Division Air Photographic Interpretation Section
  - 2nd Mobile Photographic Enlargement Section
