= List of battalions of the Parachute Regiment (United Kingdom) =

A List of battalions of the Parachute Regiment from formation in 1940 to the present day. The Parachute Regiment is a parachute infantry regiment of the British Army that was formed in the early stages of World War II.

- 1st Battalion [1940–present]
- 1st (Guards) Parachute Battalion [1946–1948]
- 2nd Battalion [1941–present]
- 2nd/3rd Battalion [1946–1948]
- 3rd Battalion [1941–present]
- 4th Battalion [1942–1946]
- 4th/6th Battalion [1946–1948]
- 5th (Scottish) Parachute Battalion [1942–1948] – formed from 7th Battalion, Queen's Own Cameron Highlanders
- 6th (Royal Welch) Parachute Battalion [1942–1946] – formed from 10th Battalion, Royal Welch Fusiliers
- 7th (Light Infantry) Parachute Battalion [1942–1948] – formed from 10th Battalion, Somerset Light Infantry
- 8th (Midlands) Parachute Battalion [1942–1946] – formed from 13th Battalion, Royal Warwickshire Regiment
- 8th/9th Battalion [1946–1948] –
- 9th (Eastern and Home Counties) Parachute Battalion [1942–1946] – formed from 10th Battalion, Essex Regiment
- 10th (Sussex) Parachute Battalion [1943–1944] – formed from volunteers from the 2nd, 4th and 5th battalions, Royal Sussex Regiment
- 11th Parachute Battalion [1943–1944] – formed from cadre of the 156th Parachute Battalion
- 12th (Yorkshire) Parachute Battalion [1943–1956] – formed from the 10th Battalion, Green Howards
- 13th (Lancashire) Parachute Battalion [1943–1945] – formed from the 2/4th Battalion, South Lancashire Regiment
- 15th (King's) Parachute Battalion [1945–1947] – formed from the 1st Battalion, King's Regiment (Liverpool) in Rawalpindi
- 16th (Staffords) Parachute Battalion [1945–1947] – formed from the 1st Battalion, South Staffordshire Regiment in Rawalpindi
- 17th Parachute Battalion [1945–1967]
- 151st Parachute Battalion [1941–1942] – formed in British India from volunteers of 27 different battalions. Redesignated 156th Battalion.
- 156th Parachute Battalion [1941–1944]

== Territorials and Volunteers ==
- 4th/6th Parachute Battalion [1947–1948]
- 4th Parachute Battalion [1967–present]
- 10th (County of London) Parachute Battalion [1947–1999]
- 11th (Middlesex) Parachute Battalion [1947–1956]
- 12th (Yorkshire) Parachute Battalion [1943–1956]
- 12th/13th (Yorkshire and Lancashire) Parachute Battalion [1956–1967]
- 13th (Lancashire) Parachute Battalion [1947–1956]
- 14th Parachute Battalion [1948–1956]
- 15th (Scottish) Parachute Battalion [1947–1992]
- 16th (Welsh) Parachute Battalion [1947–1956]
- 17th (Durham Light Infantry) Parachute Battalion [1948–1967]
- 18th (Warwickshire) Parachute Battalion [1947–1956]
