= Richard Pine-Coffin =

British Army officer

- Born: 2 December 1908; Portledge Manor, Bideford, Devon, England
- Died: 28 February 1974 (aged 65); Royal Naval Hospital Haslar, Gosport, Hampshire, England
- Military career
- Allegiance: United Kingdom
- Branch: British Army
- Service years: 1928–1958
- Rank: Colonel
- Nickname: "Wooden Box"
- Service number: 40705
- Units: Devonshire Regiment; Parachute Regiment
- Commands: 3rd Parachute Battalion; 7th (Light Infantry) Parachute Battalion; 1st Battalion, Devonshire Regiment
- Conflicts: Second World War; Palestine Emergency; Malayan Emergency
- Awards: Distinguished Service Order & Bar; Military Cross; Mentioned in Despatches (2)

Colonel Richard Geoffrey Pine-Coffin, DSO & Bar, MC (2 December 1908 – 28 February 1974) was an officer of the British Army who saw service during the Second World War. He commanded the 3rd Parachute Battalion in North Africa and the 7th (Light Infantry) Parachute Battalion in Normandy, Belgium and Germany. His troops, amused by the unusual applicability of his family name (soldiers were usually buried in simple pine wood coffins), referred to him as "Wooden Box".

== Early life ==
Born to John Edward Pine-Coffin and Louise Pine-Coffin at Portledge, the Pine-Coffin family estate in Devon, he was one of six siblings, of whom a brother named John was the youngest. He was educated at Eton and Trinity College, Cambridge. His family had a long tradition of serving in the British armed forces; his father, a brevet major in the British Army, served with the mounted infantry in the Second Boer War (gaining the Distinguished Service Order) and died in 1919, while his uncle, Lieutenant Tristram James Pine-Coffin, served in the First World War and died in northwestern Russia in 1919.

During the Second World War, R. G. Pine-Coffin's older brother, E. C. Pine-Coffin, known as Claude to his family and friends, served in Malaya as a lieutenant colonel in the British Indian Army and was captured by the Japanese after the fall of Singapore in February 1942. Unlike many prisoners of war captured by the Japanese, Claude survived. R. G. himself had been commissioned into his local infantry regiment, the Devonshire Regiment, as a second lieutenant in 1928. He was promoted lieutenant in 1931, and captain in 1938. He was promoted major (war substantive) shortly after the beginning of the Second World War.

Geoffrey and one of his sisters, Gwen were very close and shared a love of cars, as a result of which they kept a large collection of sports cars between them. The two maintained constant correspondence even after Gwen moved to South Africa, where she contracted tuberculosis of the bone and had her leg amputated at the hip.

== Second World War ==
=== North Africa ===
After the 2nd Parachute Battalion was formed on 30 September 1941, Pine-Coffin was attached from the Devons to the battalion. He subsequently moved to the 3rd Parachute Battalion in 1942 as second-in-command. He later became its commanding officer after becoming a temporary lieutenant-colonel.

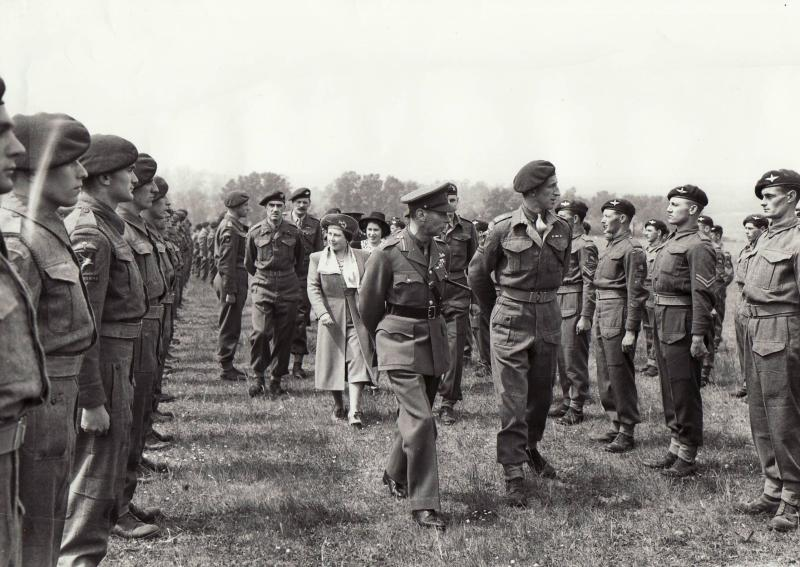
Lieutenant Colonel R. G. Pine-Coffin escorting the King and Queen during an inspection of the 7th (Light Infantry) Parachute Battalion, which Pine-Coffin commanded, 1943.

After the Allied landings against Axis-occupied northwestern Africa in November 1942, the 1st Parachute Brigade was ordered to Algeria and the 3rd Battalion was sent ahead, landing in Algiers via Gibraltar. The battalion's first operation came on the morning of 12 November, when it was dropped over a strategically important airfield near Bóne by the US 64th Troop Carrier Group. They had landed just minutes before German paratroopers were able to carry out a similar operation, which was aborted after the presence of British paratroopers was realised. The only German opposition to the 3rd Battalion came from Ju 87 Stuka dive-bombers, which had little impact. The airfield was reinforced later in the day by commandos and Spitfires. Pine-Coffin's battalion was withdrawn days later.

The 3rd Battalion served in North Africa until the end of the campaign in 1943, notably at Bou Arada and Tamera. Pine-Coffin's actions during the campaign resulted in him being awarded the Military Cross.

Pine-Coffin's tenure as the 3rd Battalion's commanding officer ended when he was called back to Britain, at a time when the battalion was preparing to take part in the Allied airborne assault on Sicily. He was appointed commanding officer of the 7th (Light Infantry) Parachute Battalion (formerly the 10th Battalion, Somerset Light Infantry), which formed part of the 5th Parachute Brigade, 6th Airborne Division.

=== Normandy ===
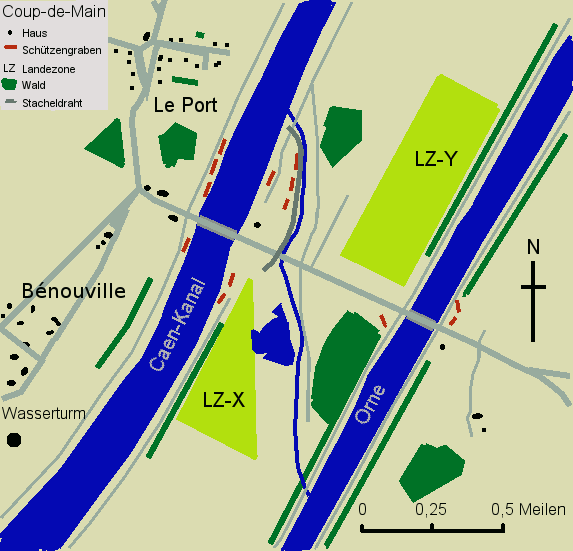
Map of the Pegasus and Horsa Bridges

With the 7th Battalion, Pine-Coffin played an important role in the 6th Airborne Division's airborne assault around the River Orne in the early hours of 6 June 1944. His battalion was tasked with reinforcing Major John Howard's 181-strong coup de main force, which had captured the Caen canal and Orne river bridges. The successful defence of these bridges was vital to 6th Airborne Division's objective of securing the Allied eastern flank. The bridges were to be held until relieved later on in the day following the Allied amphibious landings.

Pine-Coffin dropped with his battalion at 00:50; they began to arrive at the bridges at about 01:40, taking up positions in Bénouville and Le Port, west of Caen Canal. With 7th Battalion's arrival, Pine-Coffin succeeded Major Howard to command of the bridges' defence. The 5th Parachute Brigade's position was precarious; 7th Battalion had been scattered and could only muster about 40% of its strength, while the 12th Battalion was in a similar situation at Ranville, east of the Orne. Pine-Coffin's battalion came under sustained attack by the 716th Infantry Division and elements of the 21st Panzer Division but they, with difficulty, held their positions. The first relief for the beleaguered troops came at about 13:30, when elements of Lord Lovat's 1st Special Service Brigade arrived from Sword Beach and crossed the bridges to reinforce the Ranville positions. The 7th Battalion's own relief would not begin until the arrival of the 3rd Infantry Division's 2nd Royal Warwickshire Regiment at 21:15.

The 7th Battalion was moved to positions east of the Orne when their withdrawal from the bridges was completed. After a German assault by the 346th Infantry Division was driven off on 10 June, Pine-Coffin was ordered to plan for an operation to take the Le Mariquet woods, which the remnants of the German attacking force had retreated into. Just two of the 7th battalion's companies were present, but they were, with support from tanks, successful in taking the woods, and captured up to 100 soldiers. The 7th Battalion would continue to be engaged in bloody defensive battles in the area until the Allied breakout and advance to the Seine in August. Despite concerns by Pine-Coffin that his battalion was greatly fatigued, the 7th Battalion maintained its involvement in the intense Allied advance. Finally, in mid-September, the 6th Airborne Division was withdrawn back to Britain to recuperate and reorganise.

Pine-Coffin was one of many soldiers awarded medals for their service in Normandy; he was awarded the Distinguished Service Order (DSO) for his command of the Caen Canal bridge's defence on 6 June.

=== Belgium and Germany ===
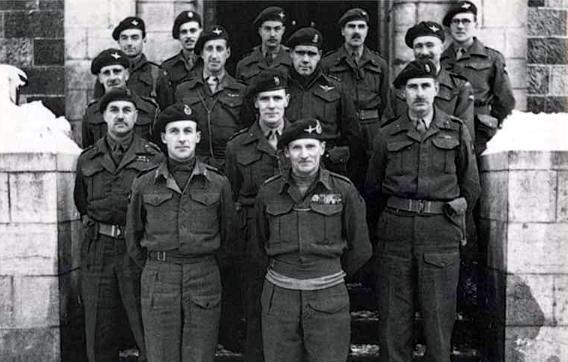
Senior officers of the 6th Airborne Division in the Ardennes, January 1945. Stood in the third row, second from the left, is Lieutenant Colonel Pine-Coffin.

After Germany launched its Ardennes Offensive in December, the 6th Airborne Division was rushed to Belgium to reinforce the Allied defence. Pine-Coffin's battalion and most of the division had only limited involvement (compared to US forces) and, after Germany's offensive was defeated in January, were withdrawn to the Netherlands and thence to Britain in February 1945.

The 7th Battalion next saw active service in the Allied airborne assault over the Rhine on 24 March 1945. Pine-Coffin was awarded a Bar to his DSO for the important role he played in the success of the operation, which was the 7th Battalion's last parachute jump of the war. His battalion's objective was to seize and hold positions near Hamminkeln, to act as a covering force for the rest of 5th Brigade in its advance on the main objectives. The battalion was the last of its brigade to make the drop, doing so whilst subject to fierce German attack from flak and other ground forces.

During heavy fighting to take the battalion's objectives, Pine-Coffin sustained serious wounds to his face; he refused to leave for treatment and continued to move around his battalion's positions encouraging his men. He was (according to the citation for the bar to his DSO) instrumental in rallying his battalion to hold out against German counter-attacks, which played a pivotal role in the successful completion of the Brigade's main objectives. The 7th Battalion was subsequently withdrawn to 5th Brigade's main positions. The battalion ended its war with the rest of the division at the Baltic port of Wismar, in May 1945.

== Later life ==
In August 1945 Pine-Coffin was promoted to substantive major; he continued to command the 7th Battalion as a temporary lieutenant-colonel, serving in the Far East and Palestine, until he left them in 1947. He was Mentioned in Despatches for service in Burma in 1946. He was promoted to the substantive rank of lieutenant colonel on 3 July 1948, and took command of the 1st Battalion, The Devonshire Regiment in Malaya. Pine-Coffin commanded the battalion through the early stages of the Malayan Emergency and oversaw its move to Colchester in February 1951. He received a further Mention in Despatches for his Malayan service.

Pine-Coffin left the Devons soon after, returning to the Parachute Regiment as its regimental colonel and commander of Depot The Parachute Regiment and Airborne Forces, a post he held from 1952 to 1955. He then became commandant of the Army MT School and garrison commander at Bordon. He retired on 20 December 1958 and was granted the honorary rank of colonel with reserve liability (which expired in 1963). He died on 28 February 1974, in the Royal Naval Hospital Haslar, survived by his son Peter.

Pine-Coffin's Second World War diaries were the basis for the 2003 book The Tale of Two Bridges, adapted by Barbara Maddox and self-published by his son, Peter Pine-Coffin.

== Personal life ==
Between his time with the army, Richard married Joan Godfrey, who gave birth to their son, Peter Pine Coffin in 1939 whilst the family was stationed in India. In 1944, Joan died of meningitis, and so five-year-old Peter was sent to live with his Aunt Kay who raised him until the end of the world war. In addition to this, Lieutenant Colonel Geoffrey Pine-Coffin was very tall and insisted on wearing cowboy boots during combat, making him easily recognisable to his fellow Allied soldiers in Normandy.

Another relative, Sgt Geoffrey Tristam Pine-Coffin (RAF/568487) was killed on 13/14 July 1943, serving as a flight engineer with 102 Squadron on an operational bombing raid to Aachen.

== Honours and awards ==
Richard Pine-Coffin's ribbons as they would appear today.

Companion of the Distinguished Service Order and Bar (DSO & Bar)	1944; 1945 (Bar)
Military Cross (MC)	1943
1939–1945 Star	
Africa Star	
France and Germany Star	
War Medal 1939–1945	With Oakleaf for Mentioned in Despatches (MID 1944)
General Service Medal	With clasp MALAYA and Oakleaf for Mentioned in Despatches (1950)
Pingat Jasa Malaysia	(Malaysia)
