= 5th Parachute Brigade =

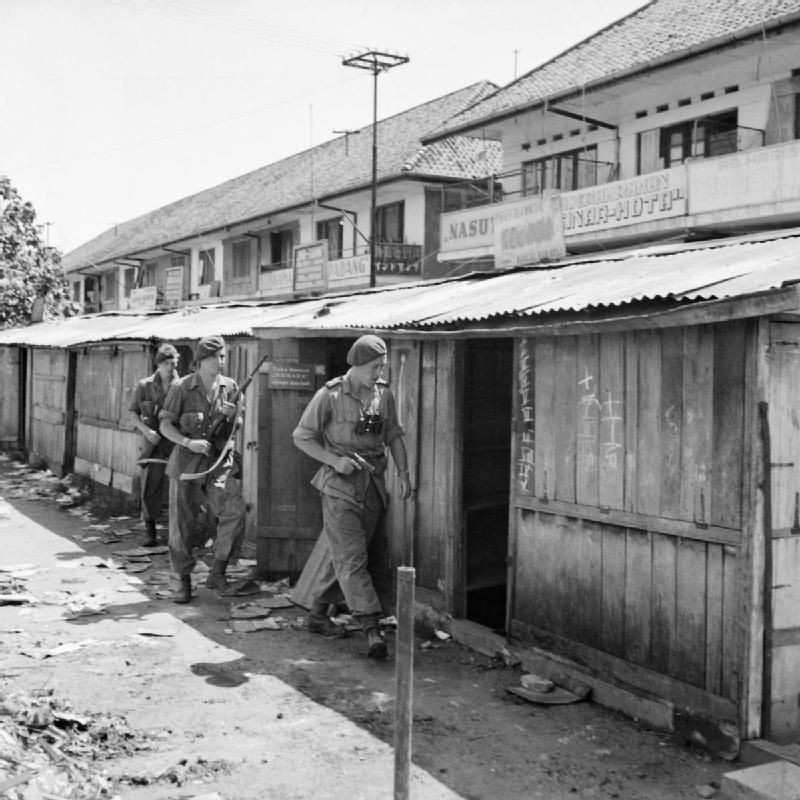
- Men of the 5th Parachute Brigade on patrol in Batavia
- Active: 1943–1946
- Country: United Kingdom
- Branch: British Army
- Type: Parachute Infantry
- Role: Airborne forces
- Size: Brigade
- Part of: 6th Airborne Division; 23rd Indian Infantry Division
- Nickname: Red Devils (Note: The 1st Parachute Brigade had been called the "Rote Teufel" or "Red Devils" by the German troops they had fought in North Africa. The title was officially confirmed by General Harold Alexander and henceforth applied to all British airborne troops.)
- Engagements: Normandy landings Capture of the Caen canal and Orne river bridges Operation Tonga; Operation Paddle; Battle of the Bulge; Operation Varsity; Advance to the Baltic; Operation Zipper; Operation Tiderace; Operation Pounce

Commanders
- Notable commanders: Brigadier Nigel Poett

Insignia
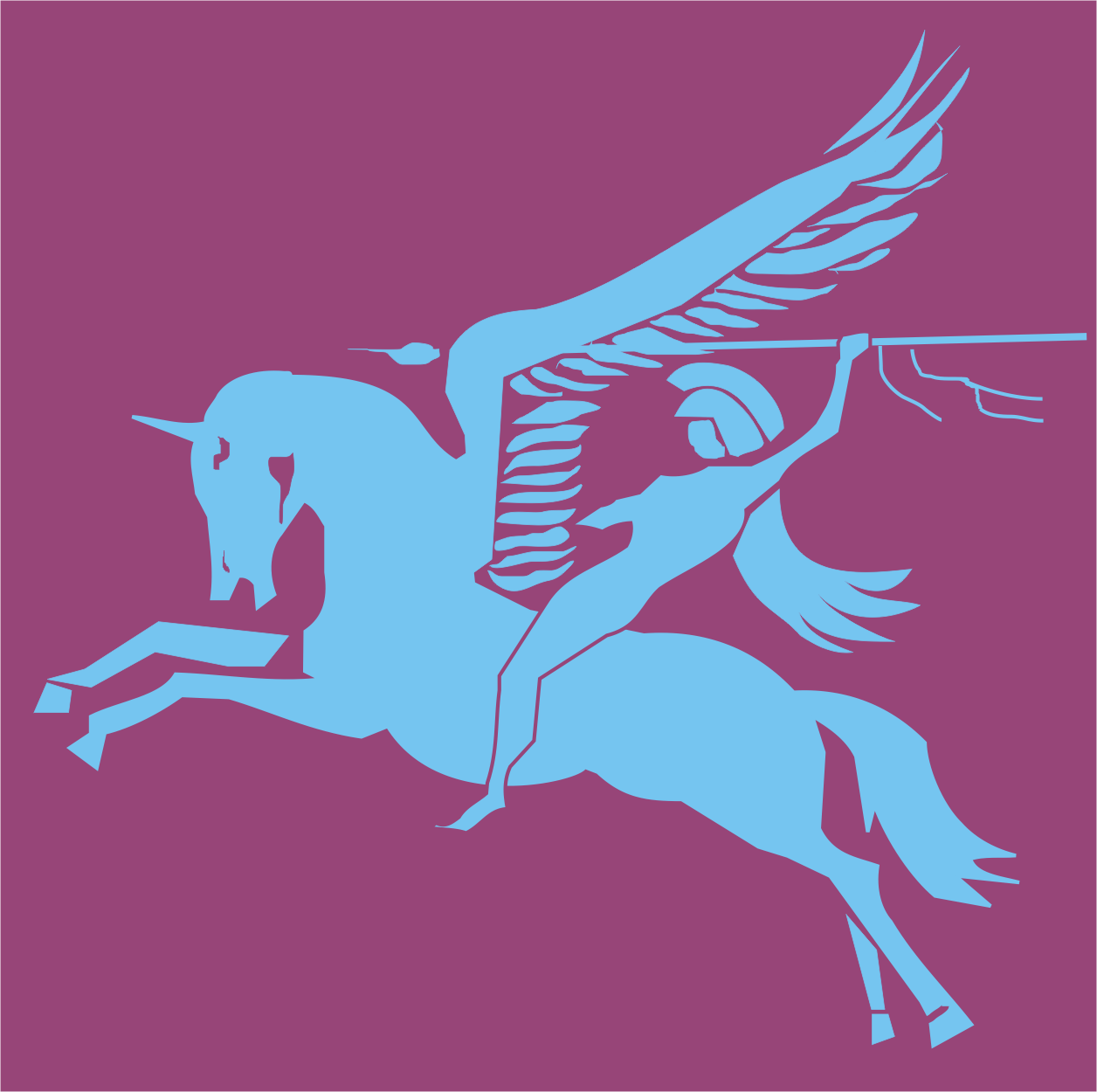
- Emblem of the British airborne forces

The 5th Parachute Brigade was an airborne forces formation of brigade strength, raised by the British Army during the Second World War. Created during 1943, the brigade was assigned to the 6th Airborne Division, serving alongside the 3rd Parachute Brigade and the 6th Airlanding Brigade.

The brigade first saw action in the British airborne landings on D-Day Operation Tonga, where it was responsible for capturing the Caen canal and Orne river bridges. The brigade remained in Normandy until September 1944, by which time it had advanced to the mouth of the River Seine. Its next engagement was in reaction to the surprise German offensive in the Ardennes, the Battle of the Bulge. This was followed by Operation Varsity, the last Allied airborne mission of the war. After this, the brigade advanced across Germany, reaching the Baltic Sea by the end of fighting in the European theatre.

The brigade was then sent to India as the division's advance party, but the war ended before it could begin operations. Instead the brigade became involved in disarming the Japanese forces in Malaya and Singapore, to restore British sovereignty. Its last operation was in Java, where it remained until a Dutch force arrived to take over. The brigade then rejoined the 6th Airborne Division, which was serving in Palestine, but was disbanded almost immediately afterwards.

== Background ==
Impressed by the success of German airborne operations during the Battle of France in May–June 1940, the British Prime Minister, Winston Churchill, directed the War Office to investigate the possibility of creating a force of 5,000 parachute troops. As a result, on 22 June 1940, No. 2 Commando assumed parachute duties, and on 21 November was re-designated the 11th Special Air Service Battalion, with a parachute and glider wing. This later became the 1st Parachute Battalion.

On 21 June 1940 the Central Landing Establishment was formed at Ringway airfield near Manchester. Although tasked primarily with training parachute troops, it was also directed to investigate the use of gliders to transport troops into battle. At the same time, the Ministry of Aircraft Production contracted General Aircraft Ltd to design and produce a glider for this purpose. The result was the General Aircraft Hotspur, an aircraft capable of transporting eight soldiers, that was used for both assault and training purposes.

The success of the first British airborne raid, Operation Colossus, prompted the War Office to expand the airborne force through the creation of the Parachute Regiment, and to develop plans to convert several infantry battalions into parachute and glider battalions. On 31 May 1941, a joint Army and RAF memorandum was approved by the Chiefs-of-Staff and Winston Churchill; it recommended that the British airborne forces should consist of two parachute brigades, one based in England and the other in the Middle East, and that a glider force of 10,000 men should be created.

== Formation ==
On 23 April 1943 the War Office authorised the formation of a second airborne division, which would be numbered the 6th Airborne Division. Under its command the division would have the existing 3rd Parachute Brigade, along with two airlanding battalions transferred from the 1st Airborne Division to form the nucleus of the new 6th Airlanding Brigade. To fill out the division, a new parachute brigade was raised on 1 July by the redesignation of the 72nd Independent Infantry Brigade. Numbered the 5th Parachute Brigade, it was initially commanded by Brigadier Edwin Flavell, but on 5 July he was given command of the Airborne Forces Depot, and Brigadier Nigel Poett took over the brigade. In 1945, while the brigade was serving in the Far East, the brigade's last commander, Brigadier Kenneth Darling, took over from Poett.

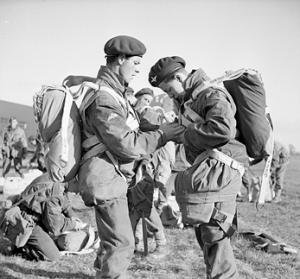
Parachute troops during Exercise Mush, April 1944

The parachute battalions in the brigade were the experienced 7th (Light Infantry), which was transferred from the 3rd Parachute Brigade, and two new parachute battalions, the 12th (Yorkshire) Parachute Battalion and the 13th (Lancashire). These were standard line infantry converted to parachute duties, and had to undergo airborne forces selection and training at the Airborne Forces Deport. (Note: The 12th Parachute Battalion were converted from the 10th Battalion, Green Howards, and the 13th Parachute Battalion from the 2/4th Battalion, South Lancashire Regiment. The 7th Parachute Battalion had previously been the 10th Battalion, Somerset Light Infantry.) On formation, each battalion had an establishment of 556 men in three rifle companies; the companies were divided into a small headquarters and three platoons. Each platoon had three Bren machine guns and three 2-inch mortars, one of each per section. The only heavy weapons in the battalions were a 3 inch mortar platoon and a Vickers machine gun platoon. By 1944 a headquarters or support company was added to the battalion, comprising five platoons: motor transport, signals, mortar, machine-gun and anti-tank. This company had eight 3 inch mortars, four Vickers machine guns, and ten PIAT anti-tank projectors.

The brigade was supported by the 4th Airlanding Anti-Tank Battery from the Royal Artillery. This battery had three troops, equipped with four Ordnance QF 6 pounders each, and provided the brigade's only anti-tank guns. Later in the war, the battery was increased to five troops, three of them retaining the 6 pounder, while the other two had four Ordnance QF 17 pounders each. While the 6 pounder could fit inside the Horsa glider, the size and weight of the 17 pounder and its Morris C8 tractor unit required the larger Hamilcar glider. The 591st (Antrim) Parachute Squadron, Royal Engineers. and the 225th (Parachute) Field Ambulance of the Royal Army Medical Corps completed the brigade formation.

'D' Company, commanded by Major John Howard, from the 2nd Battalion of the Oxfordshire and Buckinghamshire Light Infantry (OBLI), of 6th Airlanding Brigade, also served with the brigade for a one off mission in Normandy. At the end of the war, while serving in the Far East, the pathfinders of the 22nd Independent Parachute Company, (Note: The 22nd Independent Parachute Company was larger than a normal parachute infantry company, and comprised a small headquarters and three 33 man platoons.) and the Parachute Platoon from the Light Composite Company, Royal Army Service Corps, were attached to the brigade.

== Operational history ==
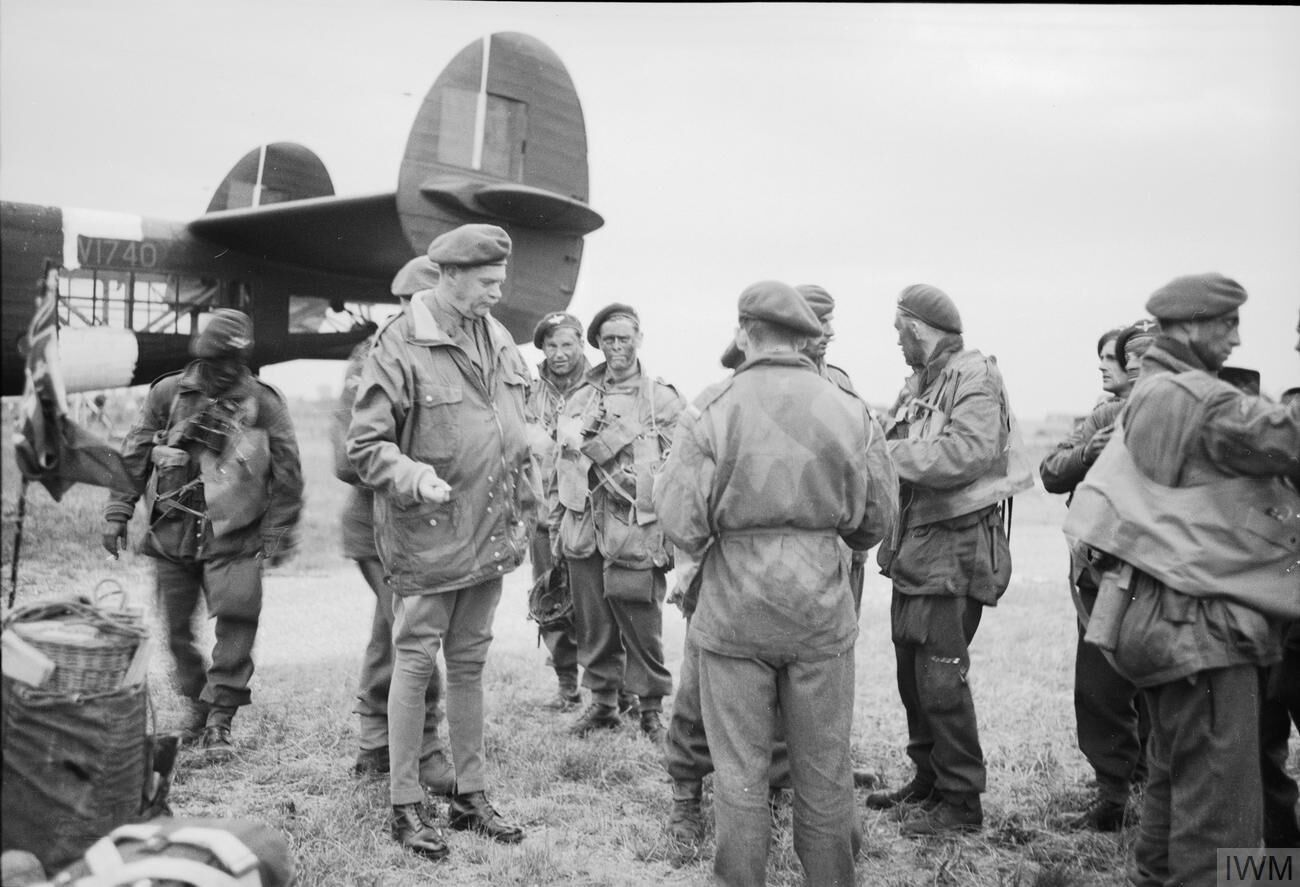
Major-General Richard Nelson Gale speaking to men of the brigade prior to take off for Normandy

From June to December 1943, the brigade prepared for operations as part of the 6th Airborne Division, training at every level from section up to division by day and night. Airborne soldiers were expected to fight against superior numbers of the enemy, who would be equipped with artillery and tanks. Training was therefore designed to encourage a spirit of self-discipline, self-reliance and aggressiveness, with emphasis given to physical fitness, marksmanship and fieldcraft. A large part of the training consisted of assault courses and route marching. Military exercises included capturing and holding airborne bridgeheads, road or rail bridges and coastal fortifications. At the end of most exercises, the troops would march back to their barracks, usually a distance of around 20 miles (32 km). An ability to cover long distances at speed was expected; airborne platoons were required to cover a distance of 50 miles (80 km) in 24 hours, and battalions 32 miles (51 km).

In April 1944, under the command of 1st Airborne Corps, the brigade took part in Exercise Mush, in the counties of Gloucestershire, Oxfordshire and Wiltshire. This was an airborne military exercise spread over three days involving the 1st and 6th Airborne Divisions. Unknown to the men of the 6th Airborne, it was a full-scale rehearsal for the division's involvement in the imminent Normandy invasion. During the invasion, the division's two parachute brigades would land just after midnight on 6 June, while the 6th Airlanding Brigade arrived later in the day just before dark. The division's objective was to secure the left flank of the invasion area, by dominating the high ground in the area between the rivers Orne and Dives. For their part in the operation, the 5th Parachute Brigade had to capture intact the Caen Canal and the River Orne bridges. To assist the brigade in its mission, 'D' Company from the 2nd Battalion, Oxfordshire and Buckinghamshire Light Infantry was taken under its command to carry out a coup de main operation on the bridges.

=== D-Day ===
Just after midnight on 6 June 1944, six Halifax bombers towing Horsa gliders, with the reinforced 'D' Company from the 2nd Oxfordshire and Buckinghamshire Light Infantry on board, crossed the French coast. Shortly afterwards, the tow ropes were released and five of the gliders landed in the strip of land between the Caen Canal and the River Orne. (Note: The sixth glider landed 20 miles (32 km) away at the River Dives.) Major John Howard commanded the company for the assault, which in short order captured the Benouville and Ranville bridges intact, for the loss of two dead and several wounded. The intention was for this force to hold the bridges until relieved by the 7th Parachute Battalion. Next, Albemarle bombers carrying the 5th Parachute Brigade's pathfinders, a group from each battalion, and the brigade headquarters started to arrive over the drop zone (DZ). Some planes got lost and failed to reach the DZ or arrived late. Others were damaged before dropping all their paratroops and turned back, and one returned to base after failing to find the drop zone at all.

At 00:50 the brigade started landing at DZ-N, just north of Ranville. Equipment and navigational failures by the RAF pilots and the division's pathfinders resulted in the brigade being scattered all over the countryside. By 02:40 only around 40 per cent of the 7th Parachute Battalion had reached their assembly point. Unable to wait any longer, the battalion headed for the captured bridges, and established a defensive position in Benouville, the division's only position west of the Caen Canal. Most of the 12th Parachute Battalion landed on the eastern edge of the DZ, and only around 60 per cent of the battalion arrived at their assembly point. Their objective was to secure the village of Le Bas de Ranville, which was achieved by 04:00. The 13th Parachute Battalion could also only muster around 60 per cent of its strength on the DZ. This battalion had two objectives; to secure Ranville and to clear the DZ of obstacles for the division's gliders which were to land next.

By daybreak all the brigade's objectives had been secured. To the west of the Caen Canal, the 7th Parachute Battalion was attacked by tanks and armoured vehicles from the 21st Panzer Division. With no heavy weapons available, one Panzer IV that reached the centre of Benouville had to be destroyed using Gammon bombs. The battalion held out all morning against attacks by German tanks and infantry, and around noon the commandos from the 1st Commando Brigade started arriving from Sword Beach. The battalion was still being attacked from the south, but the commandos' arrival meant their northern flank was now relatively secure. On the eastern side of the bridges, the 12th Parachute Battalion had been under mortar and artillery fire and was then attacked by the 21st Panzer Division's 125th Panzer Grenadier Regiment, which withdrew after losing a tank; several German infantry were taken prisoner. A second German attack was also stopped, this time assisted by the 4th Airlanding Anti-Tank Battery, which destroyed three self propelled guns and a tank. The 13th Parachute Battalion secured Ranville, which had been held by a company from the German 711th Infantry Division, and was the first French village to be liberated during the landings. This battalion was also attacked by infantry and tanks, three of which were destroyed during the day. At 21:00 the 6th Airlanding Brigade arrived at two landing zones, one on each side of the Orne river. By the end of the day the 12th and 13th Parachute Battalions were still holding Le Bas de Ranville and Ranville. The 7th Parachute Battalion, after being relieved by the 3rd Infantry Division, was now in reserve, dug in along the western side of DZ-N. The 3rd Parachute Brigade was holding a ridge of high ground to the east of the 5th Parachute Brigade, and the 6th Airlanding Brigade were moving into position to their south. The north was covered by the 1st Commando Brigade which was now under the 6th Airborne Division's command.

=== Orne bridgehead ===
Because of their positioning, the 5th Parachute Brigade was largely protected by the 6th Airborne Division's other units, and did not suffer from the almost constant German attempts to dislodge the division. However, the 12th Parachute Battalion was attacked on 7 June by seven tanks and an infantry company. The attack was beaten off for the loss of three tanks, but caused several casualties amongst 'A' Company, including the crew of their only supporting 6 pounder anti-tank gun. Later the same day during an attack on the 13th Parachute Battalion, three German self-propelled guns were destroyed, and the next day the battalion destroyed another six attacking tanks. The 12th Battalion, Devonshire Regiment arrived by sea later in the day, and took over the 12th Parachute Battalion's position. The 7th and 12th Parachute Battalions and the 2nd Oxfordshire and Buckinghamshire Light Infantry now formed the divisional reserve. Elements from three German formations were responsible for the attacks on the division; the 21st Panzer Division and the 346th and 711th Infantry Divisions.

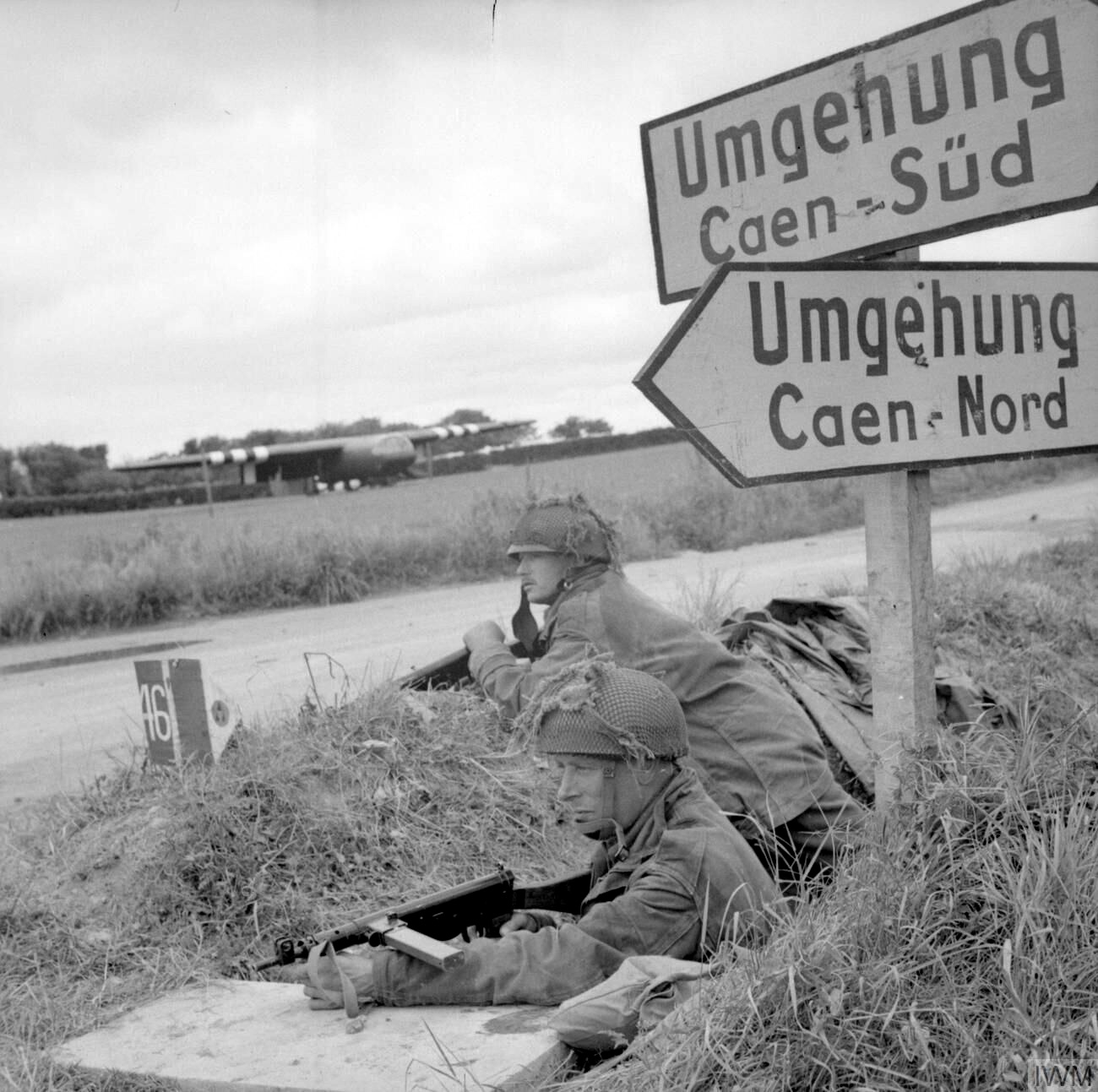
Defensive position near Ranville 7 June, with Horsa gliders in the background (The signs, in German, say Bypass)

.

On 10 June a large German force assembled to the south west of Breville and at 09:00 attacked across DZ-N towards the bridges and the 13th Parachute Battalion. Waiting until the enemy were only 50 yards (46 m) away, the battalion opened fire. Supported by the mortars and Vickers machine guns of the 7th Parachute Battalion, 'C' Company from the 13th Parachute Battalion started a counterattack which drove the Germans away. The attack had cost the Germans 400 dead and 100 captured. Major-General Richard Nelson Gale, commander of the 6th Airborne Division, decided to try to drive the Germans out of the large woods at Le Mariquet, which were occupied by the 857th Grenadier Regiment, part of the 346th Infantry Division. The operation would be carried out by the 7th Parachute Battalion, supported by Sherman tanks from 'B' Squadron 13th/18th Royal Hussars. Two companies from the battalion entered the woods, while the tanks remained outside giving covering fire. By that evening the woods had been cleared. The cost to the 7th Parachute Battalion was only 10 men wounded, but the Hussars lost seven tanks, with 10 dead and five wounded. The German defenders had 20 men killed, and 100 prisoners were taken.

At the same time, the 3rd Parachute Brigade, supported by the 5th Battalion, Black Watch from the 51st (Highland) Division, were attempting to capture Breville, the only German held village on the high ground overlooking the British positions. By 12 June Breville was still in German hands, and Gale decided on one more attack, this time at night. This would be carried out by his only reserves; the 12th Parachute Battalion, now only 350 men strong, supported by the pathfinder company, a company from the 12th Devonshire Regiment, and a squadron of tanks from the 13th/18th Hussars. The attack would be supported by artillery fire from five regiments of artillery. The assault started at 22:00, and after fighting throughout the night the village was eventually captured. British casualties were heavy; the 12th Parachute Battalion lost 141 men, the Devons another 35. The 12th Parachute Battalion was now reduced to only 55 men in its three rifle companies, plus the Headquarters Company. Some casualties were victims of the British artillery falling short. These included the 12th Parachute Battalion's commanding officer, Lieutenant Colonel Johnny Johnson, who was killed. The same shell wounded Brigadiers Hugh Kindersley of the airlanding brigade and Lord Lovat of the commandos. The next day, 13 June, the 51st (Highland) Infantry Division crossed the waterways and took over the defence of the southern sector from the airlanding brigade. This, and the assignment of the 4th Special Service Brigade to the division, allowed one brigade at a time to go into reserve to rest. The first brigade withdrawn was the 3rd, and the 5th Parachute Brigade took over their positions on the ridge of high ground, between the 1st Special Service Brigade in the north and the Highland Division in the south.

=== Advance to the Seine ===
After the capture of Breville the division was not attacked in force again, apart from an almost continuous artillery bombardment between 18 and 20 June. Further reinforcements arrived east of the River Orne on 20 July, when the 49th (West Riding) Infantry Division moved into the line between the 6th Airborne and the 51st (Highland) Division. On 7 August Gale was ordered to prepare the division to move over to the offensive, with its objective being the mouth of the River Seine. The three divisions east of the Orne together became I Corps; its commander, Lieutenant General John Crocker, knowing that the 6th Airborne had almost no artillery, vehicles or engineer equipment, did not expect it to advance very quickly. To reach the Seine, the division would have to cross three major rivers. There were two main lines of advance, the road running along the coast and another road further inland from Troarn to Pont Audemer. The commando brigade and the two parachute brigades would use the inland route, with the 3rd Parachute Brigade being responsible for the breakout when the time was right.

On 17 August the Germans began to withdraw, and the 3rd Parachute Brigade started their attack at 03:00. By 18 August the brigade had crossed the River Dives and reached the outskirts of Goustranville. Here they halted, and the 5th Parachute Brigade took over the attack, their first objective being the village of Putot en Auge.

The 7th Parachute Battalion were to secure the ground to the east of the village. Delayed on the way, they ambushed a column of Germans advancing on them, before securing their objective. The 13th Parachute Battalion, which had been under fire for three hours, dashed across 1,000 yards (910 m) of open land into cover at the base of Hill 13. Then 'A' and 'B' Companies fixed bayonets and charged up the hill. Simultaneously, a German battalion, which had just arrived to reinforce the defenders, counterattacked causing several casualties. The two companies were forced to withdraw, closely followed by the enemy. The German counter-attack was halted by an artillery barrage, and Putot en Auge was captured by the combined forces of the 7th and 12th Parachute Battalions. They also took 120 German prisoners. The 3rd Parachute Brigade then resumed the advance towards Pont-l'Évêque on the River Touques. They were held up capturing Annebault, and the 5th Parachute Brigade moved to the front again, reaching Pont-l'Évêque at 12:00 on 22 August.

The River Touques has two branches running through the town, and the 13th Parachute Battalion were given the objective of establishing a bridgehead across the river. The battalion reached and safely crossed the westernmost branch, but heavy German resistance prevented them from securing the main part of the town. Overnight a patrol managed to cross the eastern branch, using a girder that had been left spanning the river when the bridge had been blown up. The patrol was then reinforced by 'A' and 'B' Companies, and fought a three-hour battle trying to form a bridgehead. They were then withdrawn back across the river, where the 7th Parachute Battalion had dug in to form a defensive position. At the same time, the 12th Parachute Battalion had tried to cross the river using fords to secure Saint Julien and the nearby railway embankment. They, too, were stopped by heavy German fire, which pinned them down on the embankment, inflicting significant casualties; 16 dead and 50 wounded. As they were unable to proceed, brigade headquarters called off their attack, but the battalion had to wait until dark to pull back. The next day, 24 August, a patrol from the 7th Parachute Battalion discovered that the Germans had withdrawn during the night. The whole brigade crossed the river and advanced unopposed to Bourg, which was secured after a brief fight. The brigade was halted again and the commandos of 1st Special Service Brigade took over the lead. On 26 August, to provide some mobility, the Royal Netherlands Motorized Infantry Brigade was placed under the brigade's command. Together with the 6th Airborne Armoured Reconnaissance Regiment, they headed for Pont Audmer, which was the brigade's final objective. The Dutch were ordered to move with all speed, but arrived 20 minutes after the retreating Germans had blown up the bridge across the River Seine, and just before the 7th Parachute Battalion arrived by foot.

In nine days of fighting the 6th Airborne Division had advanced 45 miles (72 km), despite, as the divisional commander Major-General Gale put it, his infantry units being "quite inadequately equipped for a rapid pursuit,". They had captured 400 square miles (1,000 km^{2}) of enemy held territory, and taken over 1,000 prisoners. Since landing on 6 June the division's casualties were 4,457, of which 821 were killed, 2,709 wounded and 927 missing. The 5th Parachute Brigade had 268 killed during the campaign. The division was withdrawn from France, and embarked for England at the beginning of September.

=== Ardennes ===
In England the division went into a period of recruitment and training, concentrating on house-to-house street fighting in the bombed areas of Southampton and Birmingham. The training programme culminated in Exercise Eve, an assault on the River Thames, which was intended to simulate the River Rhine in Germany.

By December 1944 the brigade was preparing for Christmas leave, when news of the German offensive in the Ardennes broke. As part of the First Allied Airborne Army, 6th Airborne Division was available as a component of the strategic reserve for the Allied forces in northwest Europe. The other two divisions available in reserve, the American 82nd and 101st Airborne, were already at Rheims in northern France, and the 6th Airborne was sent by sea to Belgium to assist the defence. With 29 German and 33 Allied divisions involved, the Battle of the Bulge was the largest single battle on the Western Front during the war. On Christmas Day the division moved up to take position in front of the spearhead of the German advance; by Boxing Day they had reached their allocated places in the defensive line between Dinant and Namur. The 3rd Parachute Brigade were on the left, 5th Parachute Brigade on the right, and the 6th Airlanding Brigade in reserve. By the time they arrived in position the German advance had faltered.

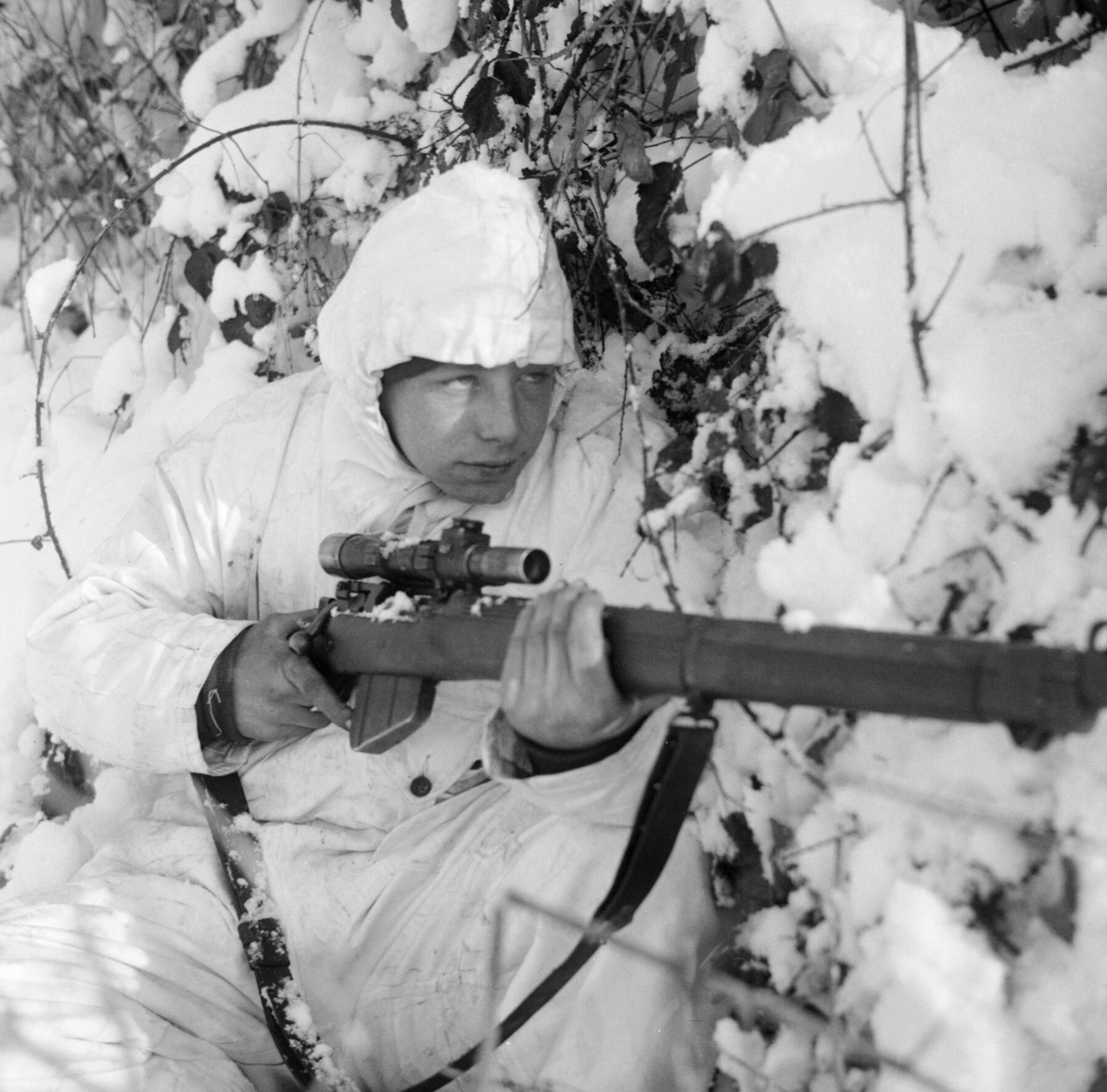
A sniper from 6th Airborne Division in winter camouflage, 17 January 1945

The 5th Parachute Brigade was ordered towards Grupont, 6 miles (9.7 km) south of Rochefort, and on 3 January became involved in the division's only fighting in the Ardennes. By 13:30 the 13th Parachute Battalion had covered 8 miles (13 km) and was in position to assault the village of Bure. The battalion had been observed by the Germans, and was met with heavy fire as their attack started. The battalion's 'A' Company made for the village, while 'B' Company attempted to secure the heights overlooking it. 'B' Company, faced with infantry supported by tanks and artillery, suffered heavy casualties, and was reduced to 21 men by nightfall. By 17:00 'A' Company had secured around half the village, and were joined by 'C' Company. Over the following day the Germans launched fifteen separate assaults to try to retake the village, but the battalion held out. With reinforcements from 'C' Company of the 2nd Ox and Bucks, the remainder of the village was captured. The battalion was then ordered to withdraw; the battle had cost them 68 dead and 121 wounded. At the same time, the 7th Parachute Battalion was attacking the village of Wavreille, which was defended by around a hundred infantry with tank and artillery support. The village was captured with minimal casualties.

Over the next days the German advance was halted and forced back, until at the end of January 1945, the brigade moved into the Netherlands. Here the division was made responsible for the area along the River Maas, between Venlo and Roermond. The brigade carried out patrols, on both sides of the river, against their opponents from the 7th Parachute Division. Near the end of February the division returned to England to prepare for another airborne mission, to cross the River Rhine into Germany.

=== Germany ===
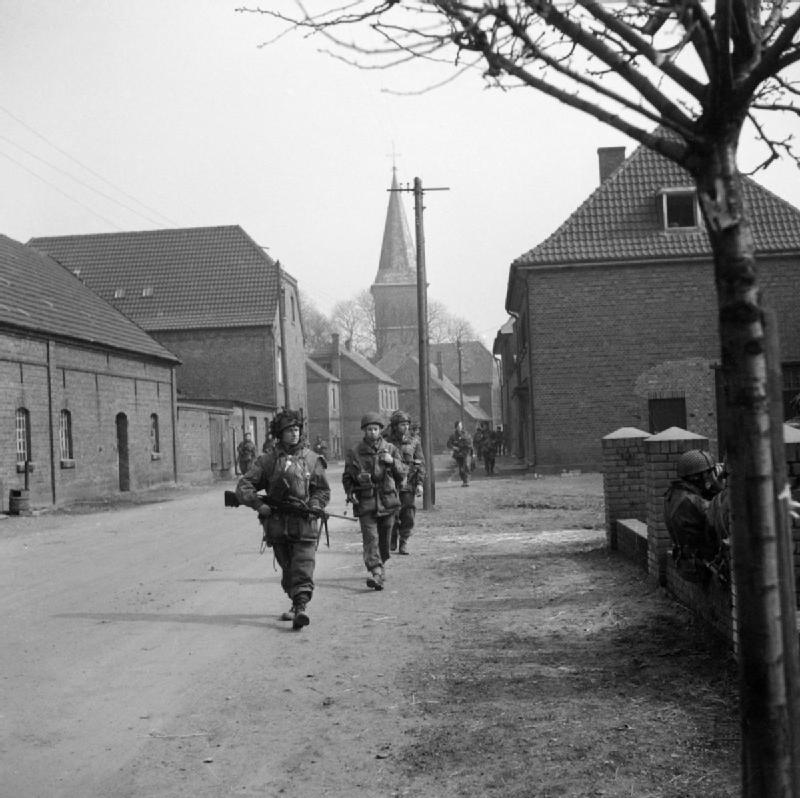
Paratroopers from the 6th Airborne Division in Hamminkeln during Operation Varsity

Whereas all other Allied airborne landings had been a surprise for the Germans, the Rhine crossing was expected and their defences were reinforced in anticipation. (Note: On 17 March there were 153 light and 103 heavy anti-aircraft guns in the area. A week later these had increased to 712 light and 114 heavy.) The airborne operation was preceded by a two-day round-the-clock bombing mission by the Allied air forces. Then on 23 March 3,500 artillery guns targeted the German positions. At dusk Operation Plunder, an assault river crossing of the Rhine by the 21st Army Group, began. For their part in Operation Varsity, the 6th Airborne Division was assigned to the American XVIII Airborne Corps alongside the US 17th Airborne Division.

Both airborne divisions began landing at the same time, 10:00 on 24 March 1945. The 6th Airborne were to protect the northern part of the landing area; they had six drop zones around the town of Hamminkeln. The plan was for them to secure the town, the high ground east of the village of Bergen, and bridges across the river IJssel. The 5th Parachute Brigade would land on the northernmost DZ, DZ-B, and hold the area east of the Wesel railway line.

The brigade arrived in the second wave of aircraft, after the 3rd Parachute Brigade, and the German anti-aircraft gunners were waiting for them. The parachute descent was made under fire, and the DZ itself was also subjected to artillery and mortar fire. The 7th Parachute Battalion suffered casualties from air burst artillery shells. Their section of the DZ was only 700 yards (640 m) from a battery of German 88 mm guns, which also targeted the brigade headquarters and the assembly areas of the 12th Parachute Battalion. The 7th Parachute Battalion secured the DZ, while the 12th and 13th Parachute Battalions headed for the brigade objective, the road from the DZ to Hamminkeln. By 15:00, despite fierce opposition, the brigade had secured its objectives, with a large number of prisoners taken, but had suffered around 700 casualties. Casualties for the division as a whole were 347 dead and 731 wounded. That night, the division was ordered to prepare to advance east into Germany from 26 March, when they were to be relieved by troops from the 52nd (Lowland) Infantry Division.

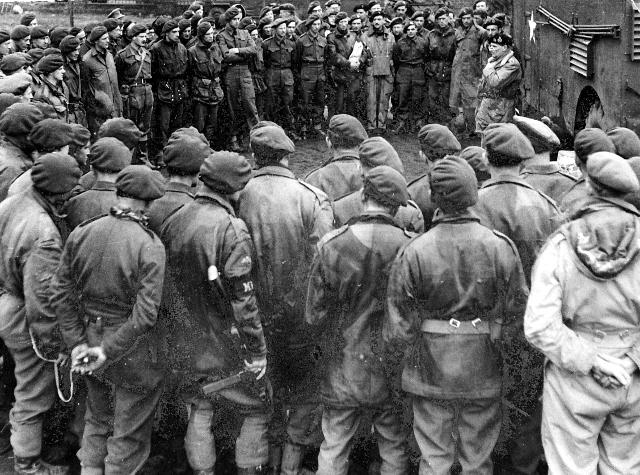
Men of the 5th Parachute Brigade listen to Field Marshal Montgomery at the brigade's headquarters at Osnabrück, Germany, 1945.

On 27 March the brigade led the division's advance. Their first objective, the village of Brünen, was unoccupied, so they pressed on to the next village, Erle, by that evening. The 7th Parachute Battalion was ordered to attack what was believed to be three self-propelled guns on the village outskirts, while the 13th Parachute Battalion captured the nearby high ground. As the 7th Parachute Battalion's leading platoon approached the guns, they were met with heavy fire from anti-aircraft and anti-tank guns. The battalion was forced to take cover and was unable to move forward; but when darkness came, they advanced and seized the position, capturing 60 prisoners, one anti-tank gun, 11 anti-aircraft guns and several light machine guns. Elsewhere, the 13th Parachute Battalion had captured the high ground and the 12th Parachute Battalion had moved 20 miles (32 km) across country, and were ready to assault Erle once daylight came. They attacked at dawn, and captured the village after a 15-minute fight. The brigade held these positions while the rest of the division passed through them to continue the advance. They then resumed the lead after the division crossed the Dortmund–Ems Canal towards Osnabrück, fighting several small engagements on the way. After the River Weser, the brigade again assumed the lead towards Leine. Supported by tanks from the 4th Armoured Battalion, Grenadier Guards, they captured two bridges at Bordenau and Neustadt, and fought a small battle at Wunstorf airfield. On 7 April the brigade was informed that they were the lead formation of 21st Army Group, having advanced further into Germany than any of its other units.

The 15th (Scottish) Infantry Division then took over from the 6th Airborne Division as the lead formation until 30 April when the airborne division once more resumed the advance, crossing the River Elbe over a bridge captured by the Scottish. The division's objective was Wismar on the Baltic Sea; the two parachute brigades advanced on separate routes to Gadebusch, aware that the brigade to arrive first would continue as the division's lead formation. By this stage of the war the advance was hampered more by refugees fleeing westwards than by any organised opposition. The 3rd Parachute Brigade won the race and led the division to Wismar, arriving on 1 May only 30 minutes before the lead troops of the Soviet Red Army advancing from the east. While the rest of the brigade remained at Wismar, 'B' Company of the 13th Parachute Battalion were sent to Denmark to liberate Copenhagen, arriving on 5 May. They remained in Copenhagen until the 1st Parachute Brigade arrived from England to relieve them.

=== Far East ===
Now that the war in Europe was over, plans were made to form an airborne corps comprising the 6th Airborne Division and 44th Indian Airborne Division for service against Japanese forces in the Far East. The corps would be used in operations to recapture Malaya and Singapore. The division's advance party, based partly on the 5th Parachute Brigade, arrived in India in July 1945. The brigade travelled ahead of the rest of the division as it had been intended to use them for Operation Zipper, an independent mission in Burma. They would have landed in Malaya, between Singapore and the Japanese forces in Burma. Reinforcements would then arrive by sea and attack northwards and southwards, while the brigade carried out another airborne landing on Singapore itself. However, following the Japanese surrender, all these plans changed, and the remainder of the 6th Airborne Division were sent to Palestine. Instead of carrying out an airborne landing, the 5th Parachute Brigade travelled by sea, leaving Bombay on 9 September and arriving at Morib in Malaya on 17 September. Only the 7th and 12th Parachute battalions landed, and they re-embarked the next day to sail for Singapore as part of Operation Tiderace; they arrived on 21 September. The brigade, now part of XV Corps, became the island's garrison. In December the 23rd Indian Infantry Division was sent from Seremban to Java, and the brigade was moved to replace them.

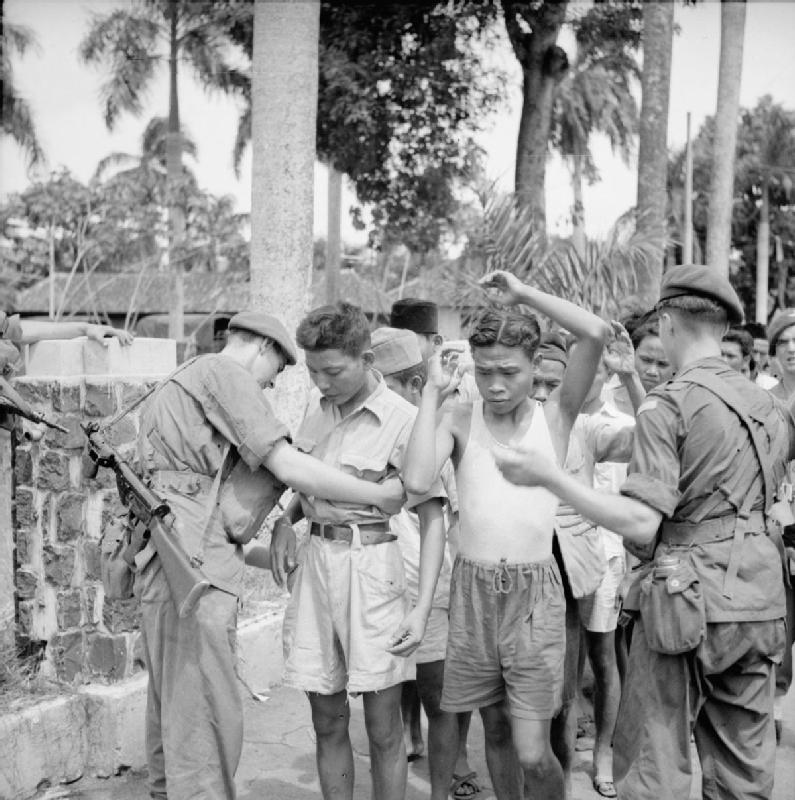
Men of the 12th (Yorkshire) Parachute Battalion searching suspects in Java on New Year's Eve 1945

By 17 December the situation in Java had worsened, and the brigade was moved again, sent as reinforcements to assist the Indian division. They arrived at Batavia three days later. The brigade's mission was to restore law and order and disarm the Japanese military forces in the area. They were told to expect to remain in Java until relieved by units of the Royal Netherlands Army. Under the command of the 23rd Indian Infantry Division, the brigade carried out Operation Pounce, clearing the town and surrounding region of dissidents. In January 1946 they were moved to garrison Semarang.

At the time Semarang had a population of around 210,000, a mixture of Indonesians, Chinese, Koreans, Dutch and Japanese. During the fighting before the brigade's arrival considerable damage had been caused to the town's infrastructure. There were no public utilities or medical services, food or water, so the brigade's engineers and medics were tasked to rectify the situation. To protect the inhabitants, the brigade's three battalions established a defensive perimeter around the outskirts of the town. Their main concern was Indonesian nationalists whose stated aim was to "slaughter all the Dutch and Chinese". To assist with security, a Japanese battalion was rearmed and given a sector of the defences to man. (Note: Prior to the British arrival, the Japanese commander had handed over his battalion's weapons to the Indonesians; when he was informed that this was against the Japanese Emperor's orders, he commanded his unarmed men to retrieve them. All their weapons were retrieved for the loss of 70 men.) The 4th Anti-Tank Battery carried out patrols inside the town limits, while the Royal Army Service Corps platoon distributed food supplies. The brigade remained in Semarang until relieved by the Dutch T-Brigade on 26 April 1946, and then returned to Singapore.

=== Mutiny and disbandment ===
On their return from Java, the 13th Parachute Battalion was stationed at Muar Camp in Malaya. The camp consisted of tents with no electricity, and no facilities for washing, cooking or recreation. Unhappy with the conditions, at 07:00 on 14 May around 260 privates grouped together and refused to disperse when ordered to do so by the orderly officer. The commanding officer then spoke to the men and ordered them to return to duty, which they again refused to do. That afternoon the commanding general arrived and spoke to them. They were then ordered to fall in and when they failed to comply, 258 men were taken into military custody. A Court of Inquiry was held which decided the 258 men were to stand trial for mutiny. In the trial, three men were acquitted, eight were sentenced to five years' penal servitude and discharged from the army, and the rest were given two years imprisonment with hard labour and discharged. Two days after sentencing, the Secretary of State for War quashed all the convictions, stating that the Judge Advocate-General had advised him that there were, "a number of irregularities of a substantial nature which may well have prejudiced the accused individually. These irregularities in his opinion rendered the trial as a whole so unsatisfactory that the convictions ought not to be allowed to stand."

The brigade spent two months in Malaya, before being ordered to rejoin the 6th Airborne Division in Palestine. The 13th Parachute Battalion was disbanded before leaving Malaya, and the remainder of the brigade arrived at Nathanya in Palestine on 5 August 1946. Shortly after disembarking, orders were received that the brigade was to be disbanded. Of the two remaining parachute battalions, the 7th was amalgamated with the 17th Parachute Battalion, retaining the number of the senior battalion, and the 12th Parachute Battalion was disbanded. Any men not immediately demobbed were distributed among the other battalions in the division. On 13 September, the 22nd Independent Parachute Company, no longer part of the brigade by this time, was also disbanded.

== Territorial Army ==
In 1947, a new 5th Parachute Brigade (Territorial) was raised as part of the Territorial Army and assigned to the 16th Airborne Division. It comprised the 12th Battalion Parachute Regiment, the 17th Battalion Parachute Regiment and the 18th Battalion, Parachute Regiment. In 1950, the brigade was renumbered the 45th Parachute Brigade (TA).

== Order of battle ==
Commanders

- Brigadier Edwin Flavell
- Brigadier Nigel Poett
- Brigadier Kenneth Darling

Units – Europe

- 7th Parachute Battalion
- 12th Parachute Battalion
- 13th Parachute Battalion
- 'D' Company, 2nd Battalion, Oxfordshire and Buckinghamshire Light Infantry
- 225th Parachute Field Ambulance, Royal Army Medical Corps
- 4th Airlanding Anti-Tank Battery, Royal Artillery
- 591st (Antrim) Parachute Squadron, Royal Engineers

Units – Far East

- 7th Parachute Battalion
- 12th Parachute Battalion
- 13th Parachute Battalion
- 225th Parachute Field Ambulance, Royal Army Medical Corps
- 4th Airlanding Anti-Tank Battery, Royal Artillery
- 22nd Independent Parachute Company, Army Air Corps
- 591st (Antrim) Parachute Squadron, Royal Engineers
- Parachute Platoon, Light Composite Company, Royal Army Service Corps

== Notes ==
Footnotes

Citations
