= Schnappenberg =

Mountain in Bavaria, Germany

Coordinates: 47°45′52″N 12°29′06″E

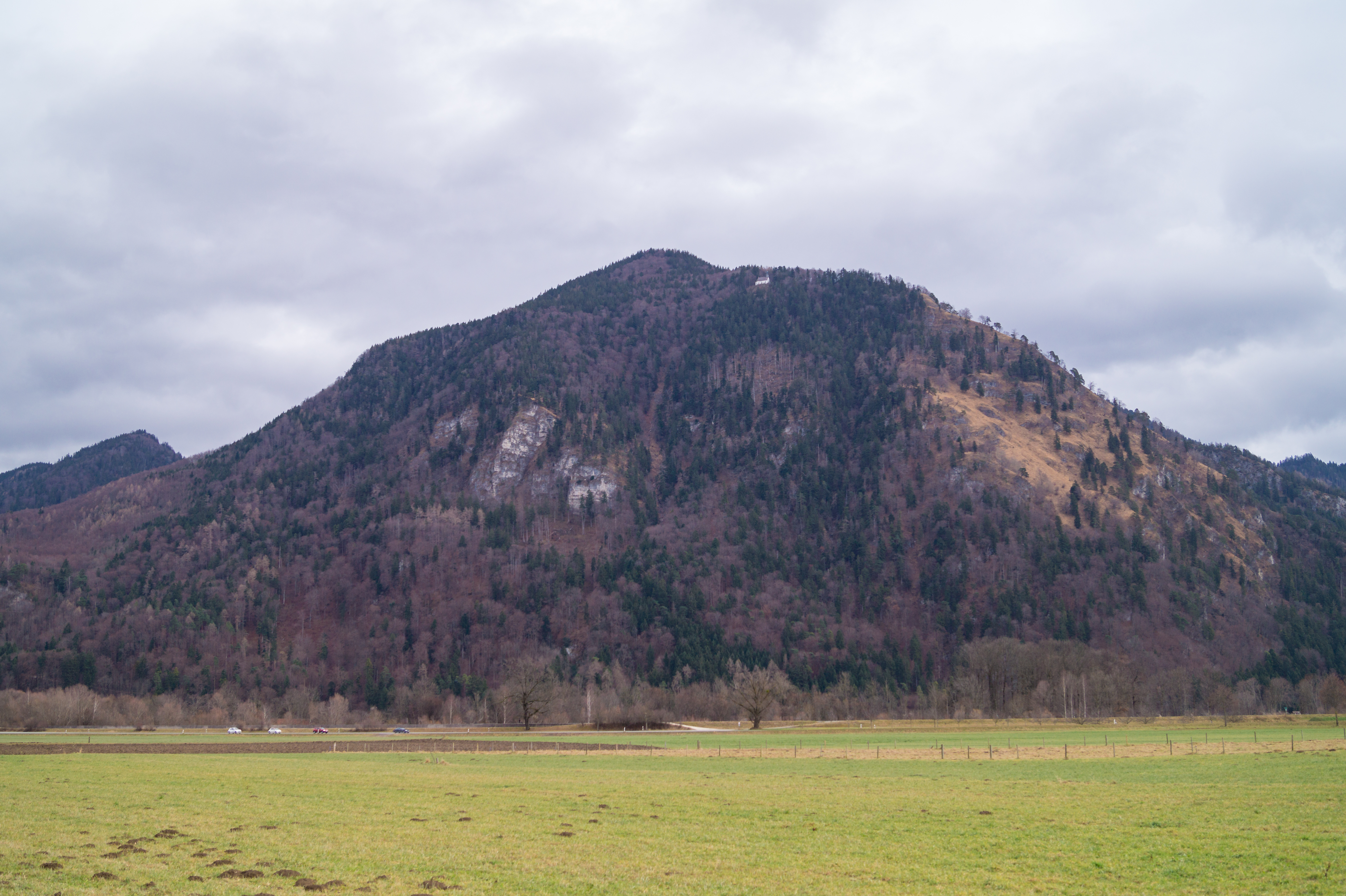
- Schnappenberg with the snap church from the west

Highest point
- Elevation: 1,260 m (4,130 ft)

Geography
- Location: Bavaria, Germany

Schnappenberg is a mountain in Bavaria, Germany.
