= 13th (Lancashire) Parachute Battalion =

- Cap badge of the Parachute Regiment
- Active: 1943–1946; 1947–1956 (Territorial Army)
- Country: United Kingdom
- Branch: British Army
- Type: Infantry
- Role: Airborne forces
- Size: Battalion
- Part of: 5th Parachute Brigade
- Nickname: Red Devils
- Motto: Win or Die
- Engagements: Normandy; Battle of the Bulge; Rhine crossing

Commanders
- Notable commanders: Lieutenant-Colonel PJ Luard, DSO OBE

Insignia
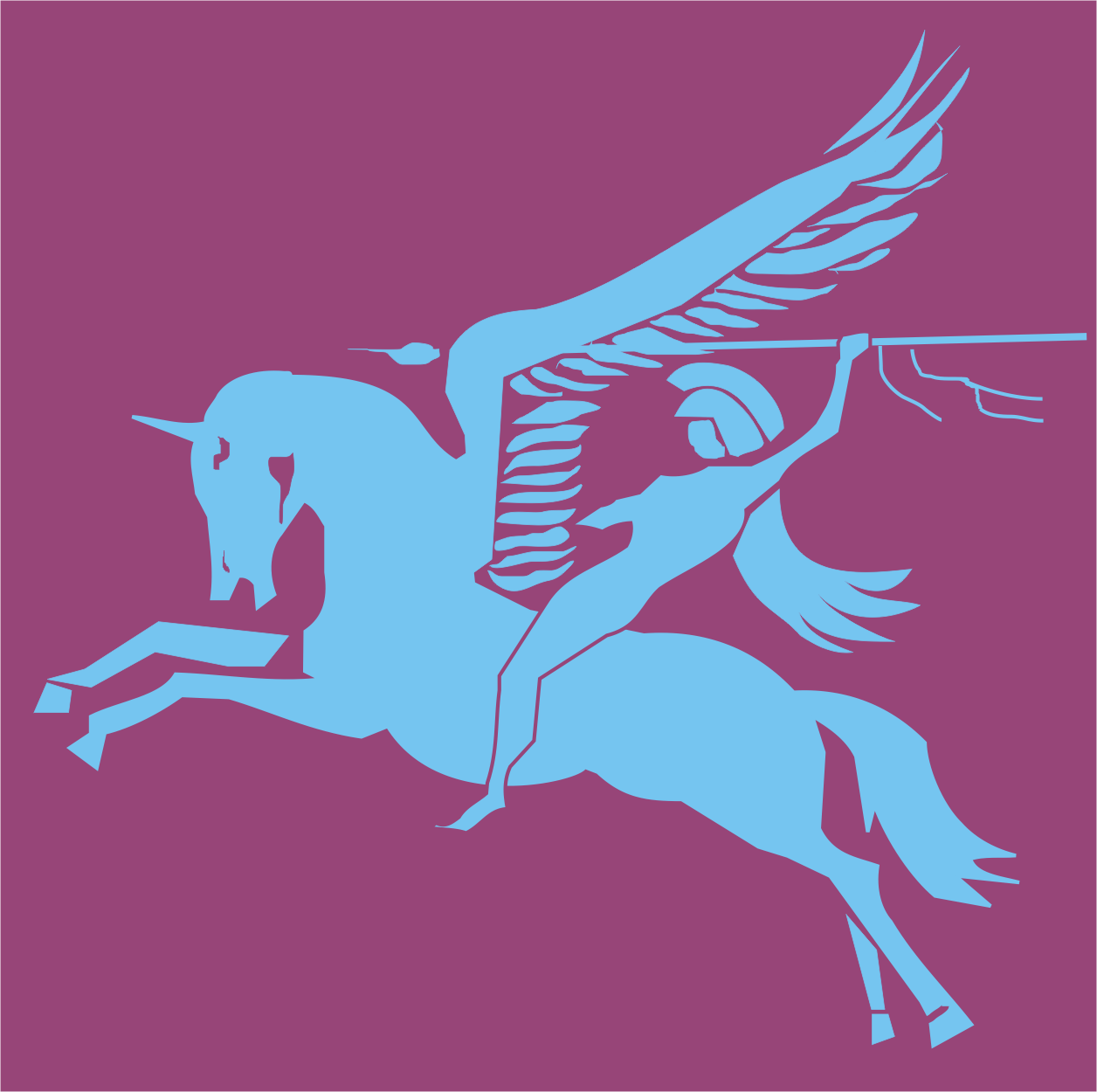
- The emblem of the Second World War British Airborne Forces, Bellerophon riding the flying horse Pegasus

The 13th (Lancashire) Parachute Battalion was an airborne infantry battalion of the Parachute Regiment, raised by the British Army during the Second World War. The battalion was formed in May 1943 by the conversion of the 2/4th Battalion, South Lancashire Regiment to parachute duties and was assigned to the 5th Parachute Brigade in the 6th Airborne Division.

In June 1944, the battalion took part in Operation Tonga, the invasion of Normandy on D-Day, and the 6th Airborne Division advance to the River Seine, before being withdrawn back to England. Three months later they were sent to Belgium to help counter the surprise German Ardennes offensive, which became known as the Battle of the Bulge. Later, in March 1945, the battalion took part in the last airborne operation of the war: the River Rhine crossing in Germany. After the war in Europe ended, they were sent to India to conduct operations against the Japanese Empire, however, the war ended before they could begin. As a result, the battalion was sent to British Malaya, Singapore and Java to help disarm the Japanese occupiers and restore law and order. While in the Far East, 252 men of the battalion were convicted of mutiny and soon afterwards, in May 1946, the battalion was disbanded.

A new 13th Parachute Battalion (TA) was raised when the Territorial Army was reformed in 1947. Over the years, as a result of a number of amalgamations, this battalion eventually became part of the present day 4th Battalion.

== Formation history ==
=== Background ===
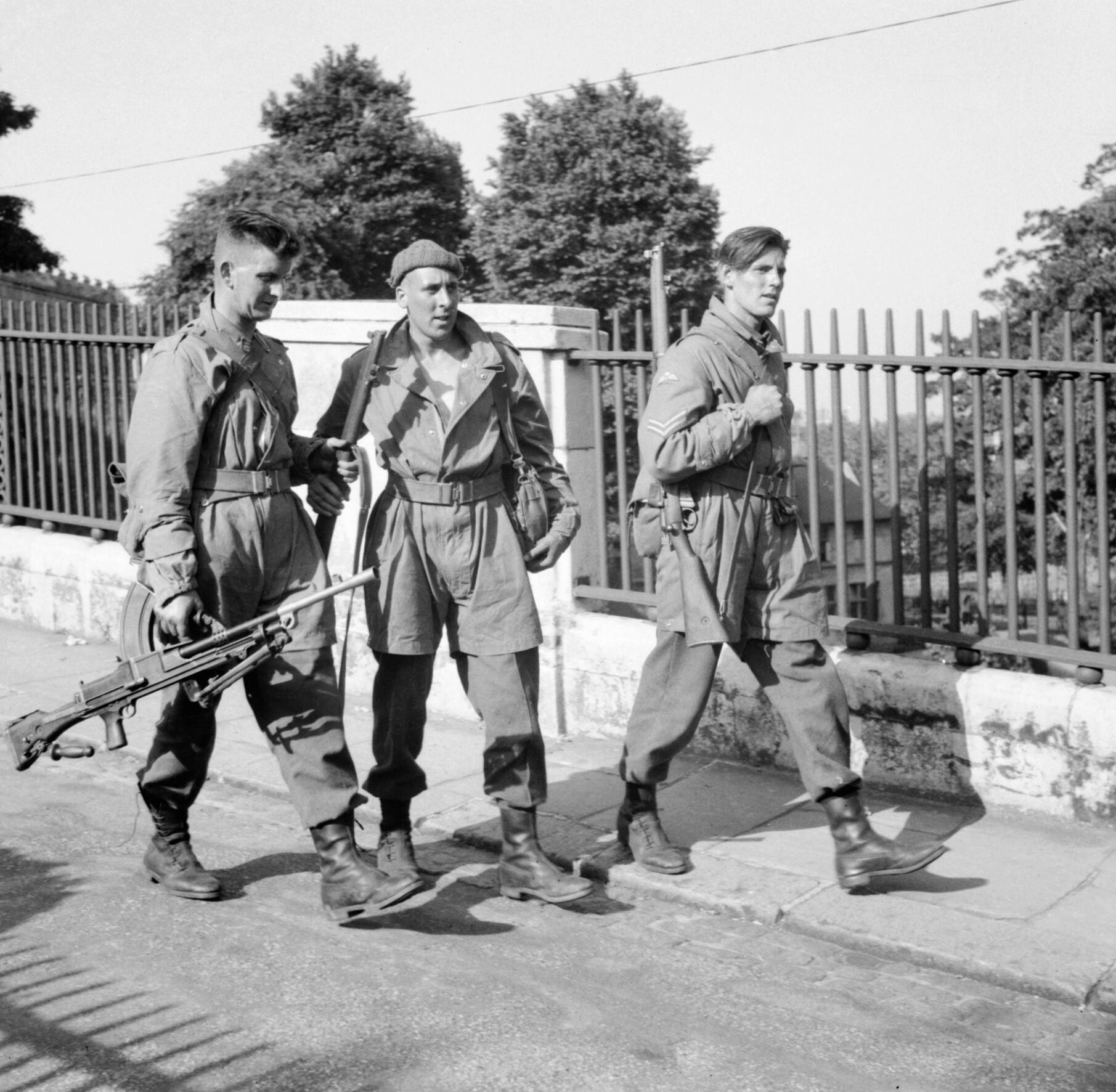
British paratroops wearing 'jump jackets', in Norwich during exercises 23 June 1941

Impressed by the success of German airborne operations during the Battle of France, the then Prime Minister of the United Kingdom, Winston Churchill, directed the War Office to investigate the possibility of creating a corps of 5,000 parachute troops. The standards set for British airborne troops were extremely high, and from the first group of 3,500 volunteers only 500 men were accepted to go forward to parachute training.

Additionally, on 22 June 1940, a Commando unit, No. 2 Commando, was turned over to parachute duties and on 21 November re-designated the 11th Special Air Service Battalion, with a parachute and glider wing. It was these men who took part in the first British airborne operation, Operation Colossus, on 10 February 1941. The 11th SAS Battalion later became the 1st Parachute Battalion. The success of the raid prompted the War Office to expand the existing airborne force, setting up the Airborne Forces Depot and Battle School in Derbyshire in April 1942, and creating the Parachute Regiment as well as converting a number of infantry battalions into airborne battalions in August 1942. (Note: In most conversions, the majority of the original battalion either did not wish to become paratroopers, or failed medical or other tests. The spaces in the battalion were then filled with volunteers from other units.)

=== Battalion ===
The 13th (Lancashire) Parachute Battalion was formed in May 1943 by the conversion of the 2/4th Battalion, South Lancashire Regiment to parachute duties. This was the last British parachute battalion formed before the invasion of France, and was assigned to the 5th Parachute Brigade, part of the 6th Airborne Division. The first commanding officer (CO) was Lieutenant-Colonel Russell, who was succeeded by Lieutenant-Colonel Peter Luard. Upon formation, the battalion was based at Larkhill and had an establishment of 556 men in three rifle companies. The companies were divided into a small headquarters and three platoons. The platoons had three Bren machine guns and three 2-inch mortars, one of each per section. The only heavy weapons in the battalion were a platoon each of 3 inch mortars (despite its name, the mortar had a calibre of 3.19 inches) and Vickers machine guns. By 1944, a headquarters or support company, was added to the battalion. It comprised five platoons—motor transport, signals, mortar, machine-gun and anti-tank—and was equipped with eight 3.19-inch (81 mm) mortars, four Vickers machine guns and ten PIAT anti-tank projectors.

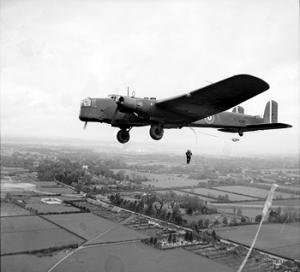
Parachute troops jumping from an Armstrong Whitworth Whitley near Windsor in England.

All members of the battalion had to undergo a 12-day parachute training course, which was carried out at No. 1 Parachute Training School, RAF Ringway. Training consisted of an initial parachute jump from a converted barrage balloon and finished with five jumps from an aircraft. (Note: Barrage balloons were used to speed up training jumps and meet the target of 5,000 trained parachutists.) Anyone failing to complete a descent was returned to his old unit, while those men who successfully completed the parachute course were presented with their maroon beret and parachute wings.

Airborne soldiers were expected to fight against superior numbers of the enemy, armed with heavy weapons, including artillery and tanks. As a result, training was designed to encourage a spirit of self-discipline, self-reliance and aggressiveness. Emphasis was given to physical fitness, marksmanship and fieldcraft. A large part of the training regime consisted of assault courses and route marching. Military exercises included capturing and holding airborne bridgeheads, road or rail bridges and coastal fortifications. At the end of most exercises, the battalion would march back to their barracks. An ability to cover long distances at speed was expected: airborne platoons were required to cover a distance of 50 miles (80 km) in 24 hours, and battalions 32 miles (51 km). (Note: This ability was demonstrated in April 1945 when the 3rd Parachute Brigade advanced 15 miles (24 km) in twenty-four hours, which included eighteen hours of close-quarters fighting. In the same month, the 5th Parachute Brigade marched 50 miles (80 km) in seventy-two hours, during which they also carried out two night time assaults.)

== Operational history ==
=== Normandy ===
At 00:50 on 6 June 1944, as part of Operation Tonga, the 13th Parachute Battalion landed in Normandy. The battalions drop was scattered over a large area and only around sixty percent of the battalion's men were at the forming up point when they headed off towards their objectives. The battalion had been tasked with securing the area around Drop Zone 'N' and the River Orne and Caen Canal bridges that had been captured in a coup-de-main by a glider-borne force from the 2nd Battalion, Oxfordshire and Buckinghamshire Light Infantry, part of 6th Airlanding Brigade. The battalion also had to secure the town of Ranville, which it achieved at around 04:00 against heavy resistance from the Germans. One company from the battalion remained at the landing-zone to provide protection for 591st (Antrim) Parachute Squadron, Royal Engineers, who were to demolish poles and explosives positioned to prevent a glider landing, so that the divisional headquarters could land safely. By midnight' the battalion, less 62 men who were missing, was occupying Ranville. Dug in around Ranville the battalion was subjected to artillery and mortar bombardments, and sporadic infantry assaults. This lasted until 17 June' when they were relieved by the 1st Canadian Parachute Battalion and move to Le Mesnil. On 25 June' the battalion was sent to rest in the Benourville area.

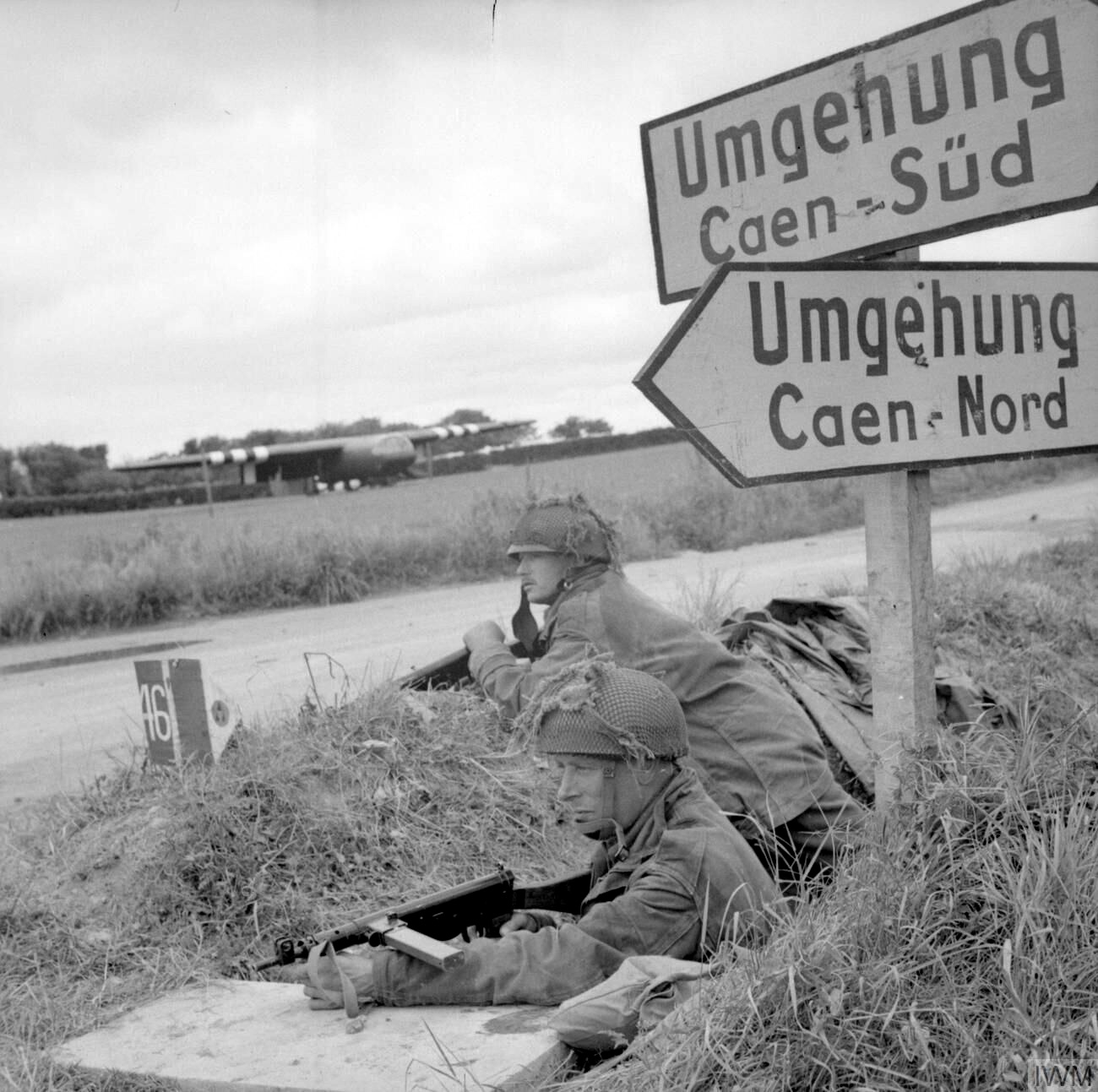
British paratroopers in Normandy

On 3 July, 100 infantry replacements arrived. On 5 July, the battalion returned to the front line taking over their original positions from the Canadians. By now, German activity had lessened, while in the front line the battalion kept up a programme of patrols. Around half of July was spent in the rear areas training as the divisional assault battalion or resting. The battalion returned to the front on 7 August, taking over the positions of the No. 46 (Royal Marine) Commando near Sallenelles. German activity was light and the battalion was employed in carrying out patrols until 13 August, when it was once again relieved and went into reserve. While in reserve, it practised manoeuvre warfare in anticipation of the expected advance.

The 6th Airborne Division's advance started 17 August 1944. The 13th Battalion followed up the leading elements on 18 August, when it crossed the River Dives at Troarn and attacked Putot en Auge. On 19 August, the battalion was involved in the battle of Hill 13, which cost them 70 dead and wounded. On 22 August, they had reached Pont L'Eveque. By 14:15, the whole battalion had entered the town, in the face of heavy resistance which included fire from anti-aircraft guns that were being used in a ground role. Supported by a troop of Cromwell tanks from the 6th Airborne Armoured Reconnaissance Regiment, the town was secured up to the bridge. The following day, at 06:00, 'B' Company assaulted the bridge securing a bridgehead on the far bank. The rest of the battalion soon followed, but by 1330 following fierce German resistance, the battalion was forced to withdraw covered by the 7th Parachute Battalion. The next day, 24 August, the Germans withdrew from the bridge followed by the battalion, which established a blocking position at Les Authieux sur Calonne to cut off the German retreat. Remaining in position until 26 August, they resumed the advance, passing through Saint Maclou to Pont Audemer, and eventually reached Genneville where the advance was stopped. On 3 September, the battalion's remaining 16 officers and 270 men left France for Southampton.

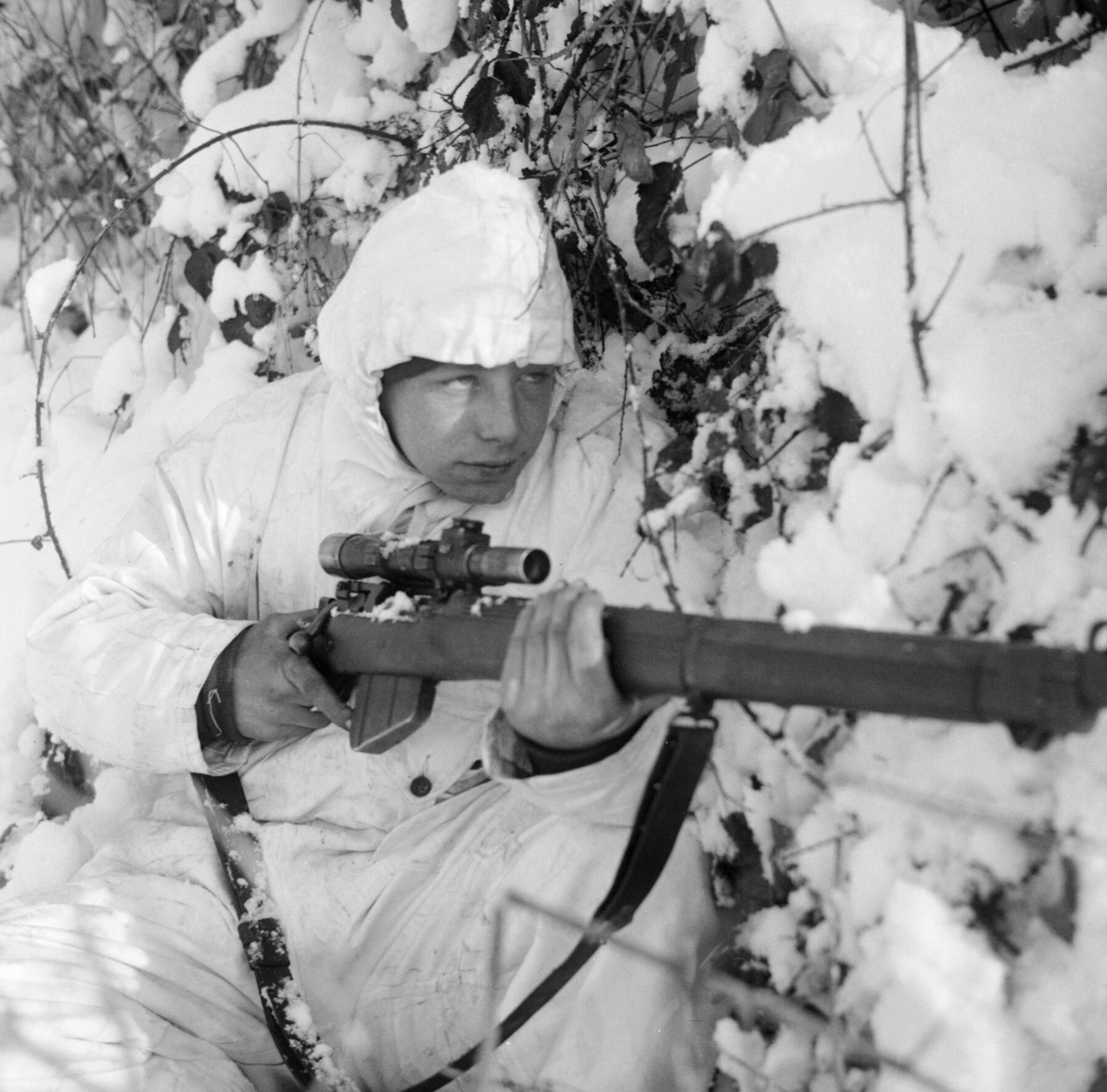
Airborne Sniper in the Ardennes 17 January 1945

=== Ardennes ===
In December 1944, the battalion was still reforming after the Normandy battles when they were moved to Belgium to help counter the German advance in the Ardennes, known as the Battle of the Bulge. By 29 December, the 6th Airborne Division was established along the River Meuse. The 13th Parachute Battalion was attached to the 29th Armoured Brigade of 11th Armoured Division. On 2 January 1945, they were ordered to capture the villages of Bure and Grupont supported by the Sherman tanks of the Fife and Forfar Yeomanry. Once these had been captured a crossing over the River Lhomme would be seized to stop the German breakthrough.

The following day, the battalion left Resteigne on foot and at 13:00 started the attack on Bure. 'A' Company was to secure the village, while 'B' Company secured the high ground and 'C' Company was in reserve. The village was defended in force and the assault was met with sustained and heavy mortar and machine gun fire, supported by armoured vehicles. Despite the heavy fire both 'A' and 'B' Companies managed to capture half the village. At 17:00, 'C' Company was sent in to reinforce them, supported by tank and artillery fire.

The battalion formed a number of strong points in their half of the village, carried out fighting patrols and fought off four German counterattacks. One attack on 'A' Company, was only defeated when they called down artillery fire on their own positions. In the closeness of the fighting, the paratroopers used their fighting knives to avoid giving away their locations and casualties could not be evacuated or supplies brought forward.

On 4 January, the battalion was subjected to a continuous artillery barrage, and fought off another five German counterattacks. Later that day they were reinforced by a company from the Oxfordshire and Buckinghamshire Light Infantry. In the early hours of 5 January, the battalion started another attack and had successfully captured the rest of the village by 21:00. During the same time, the 7th Parachute Battalion had captured Grupont and at 22:00 the battalion became the brigade reserve. The battle for Bure had cost the 13th Battalion 68 killed and 121 wounded.

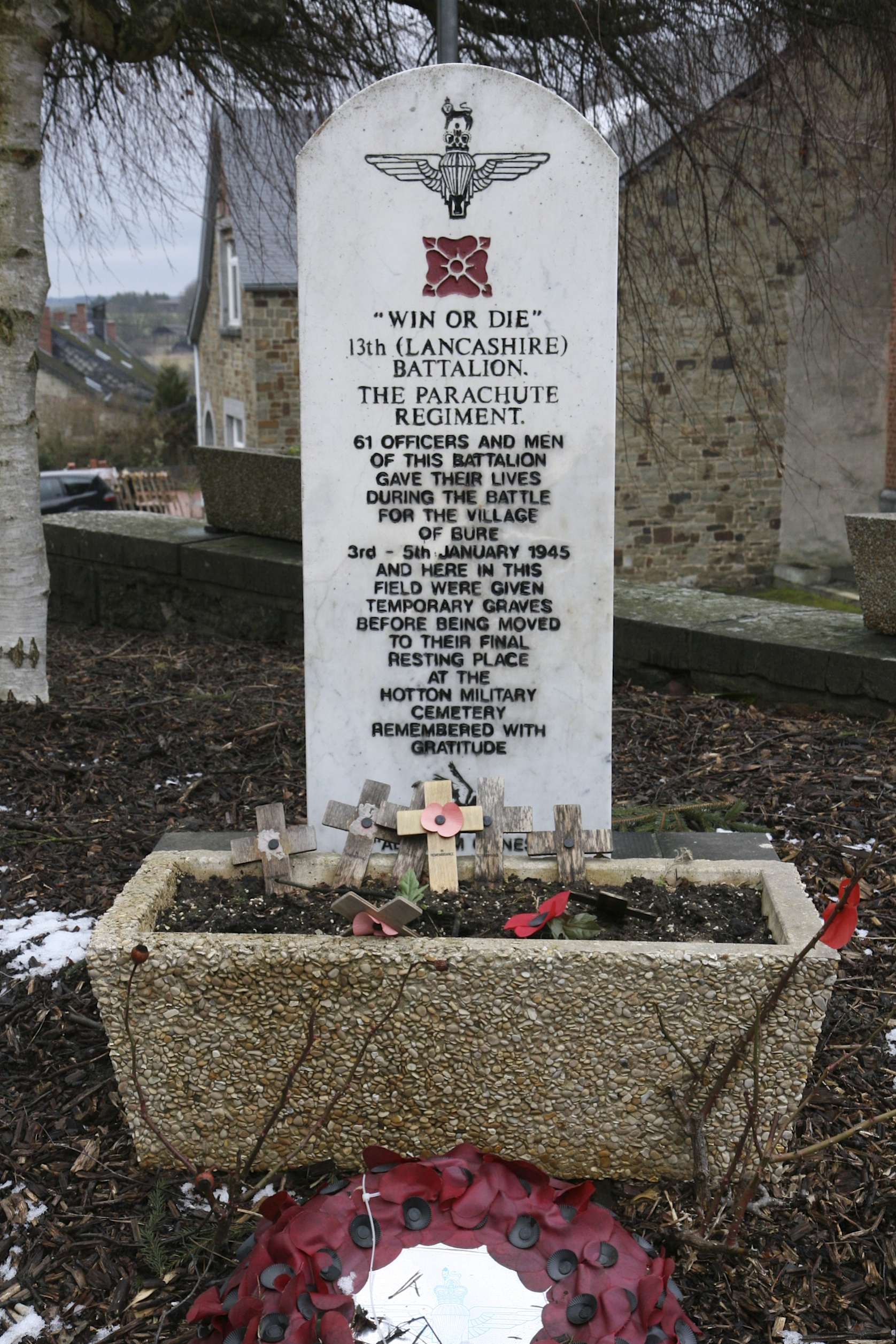
Memorial at Bure, Belgium

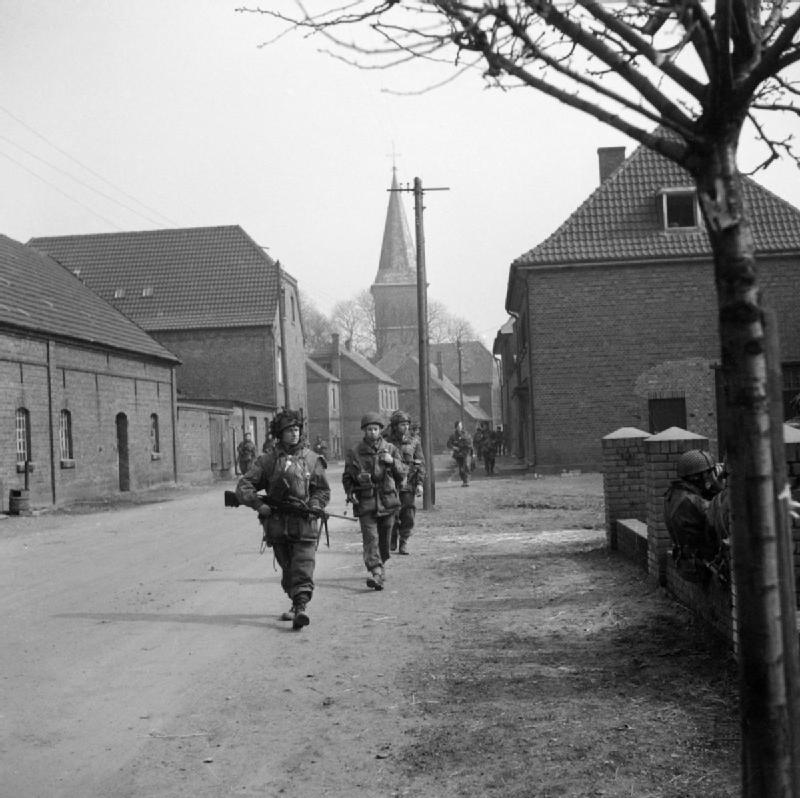
Paratroops advance through a German town March 1945

=== Germany ===
The battalion was next in action during Operation Varsity the airborne assault crossing of the River Rhine. The 5th Parachute Brigade arrived around ten minutes after the 3rd Parachute Brigade had already landed and, as a result, the German defenders were already alert and waiting.

The brigade was designated to land on Drop Zone B and achieved this, although not as accurately as 3rd Parachute Brigade due to poor visibility around the drop zone, which also made it more difficult for paratroopers of the brigade to rally. The drop zone came under heavy fire from German troops stationed nearby, and was subjected to shellfire and mortaring, which inflicted casualties in the battalion rendezvous areas. However, 7th Parachute Battalion soon cleared the DZ of German troops, many of whom were situated in farms and houses, and the 12th and 13th Parachute Battalions rapidly secured the rest of the brigade's objectives. The brigade was then ordered to move due east and clear an area near Schnappenberg, as well as to engage German forces gathered to the west of the farmhouse where the 6th Airborne Division Headquarters was established. By 15:30, Brigadier Poett reported that the brigade had secured all of its objectives and linked up with other British airborne units.

The 13th Battalion's advance out of the bridgehead began the next day on 27 March, reaching Brunen without any opposition. Until then, the 7th Parachute Battalion had been leading the brigade but the 13th Battalion then took over and secured the high ground overlooking the village of Erle, which was captured that night by the 12th Parachute Battalion. By the beginning of April, the brigade was supported by tanks from the 6th Guards Tank Brigade and heading towards Osnabrück, which was reached with the battalion leading on the night 4 April. After a short rest the brigade's advance began again on 8 April with orders to head for Neustadt and Bordenau to secure crossings over the River Leine. The battalion was in reserve as the 7th and 12th battalions headed towards the two towns, securing the bridge at Bordenau intact. The 13th Battalion continued the advance into Germany behind the 15th (Scottish) Infantry Division until 30 April when they were ordered to head towards Wismar on the Baltic Sea, arriving just before the lead units of the Red Army.

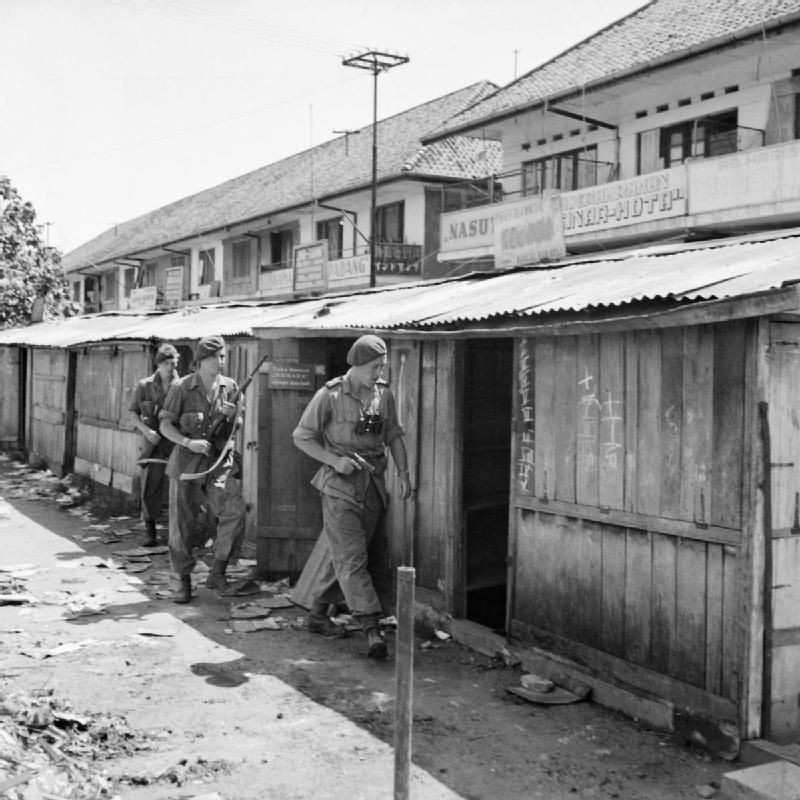
Paratroopers on patrol in Batavia

=== Far East ===
When the war in Europe ended, it was intended to send the 6th Airborne Division to the Far East to take part in operations against the Japanese Empire alongside the 44th Indian Airborne Division. However, only the advance party of the 5th Parachute Brigade had reached India by the time that the war ended and, as a result, the battalion took no active part in the fighting against the Japanese. Nevertheless, the brigade landed from the sea in northern Malaya and then moved to Singapore to re-establish British control.

The 13th Battalion, still with 5th Parachute Brigade, were initially deployed to Batavia in Java, where they were placed under the command of the 23rd Indian Infantry Division. It was soon moved to Semarang on the northern coast, however, arriving there on 9 January 1946. Upon arrival, the 13th Battalion assumed responsibility for the docks and the town centre. They also carried out patrols around local villages to deter extremists and guerrilla groups infiltrating into the town. In April, a Dutch brigade arrived and the battalion returned to Singapore.

On 13 May 1946, while stationed at Muar Camp Malaya, 255 men refused to obey the commanding officer's orders and were later charged with mutiny. Of the 255 men, three were acquitted, and eight were sentenced to five years' penal servitude and to be discharged from the army. The rest were given two years' imprisonment with hard labour and discharged. Two days after sentencing, after a review by the Judge Advocate-General, the sentences were quashed. Commenting "there was a number of irregularities of a substantial nature which may well have prejudiced the accused individually. These irregularities in his opinion rendered the trial as a whole so unsatisfactory that the convictions ought not to be allowed to stand."

The 5th Parachute Brigade then left the Far East to rejoin the 6th Airborne Division now serving in Palestine. The 13th Parachute Battalion, however, was disbanded just before leaving Malaya.

== Territorial Army ==
In 1947, when the Territorial Army was reformed, a new 13th (Lancashire) Parachute Battalion (TA) was raised. The battalion served in the 44th Independent Parachute Brigade Group (TA) alongside the 10th (City of London) Parachute Battalion, 12th (Yorkshire) Parachute Battalion, 15th (Scottish) Parachute Battalion and the 17th (Durham Light Infantry) Parachute Battalion. In October 1956, following defence cuts, the 13th Battalion was amalgamated with the 12th Battalion to form 12/13 PARA (TA). The 12th/13th Battalion was itself amalgamated with the 17th Battalion in 1967, forming the 4th Battalion, Parachute Regiment.

== Notes ==
Footnotes

Citations
