= 7th (Light Infantry) Parachute Battalion =

- Cap badge of the Parachute Regiment
- Active: 1942–1948
- Country: United Kingdom
- Branch: British Army
- Type: Airborne forces
- Role: Parachute infantry
- Size: Battalion
- Part of: 3rd Parachute Brigade; 5th Parachute Brigade
- Nickname: Red Devils
- Mottos: Utrinque Paratus (Latin for Ready for Anything)
- Engagements: Capture of the Caen canal and Orne river bridges Operation Varsity

Commanders
- Notable commanders: Lieutenant Colonel RG Pine-Coffin DSO MC

Insignia
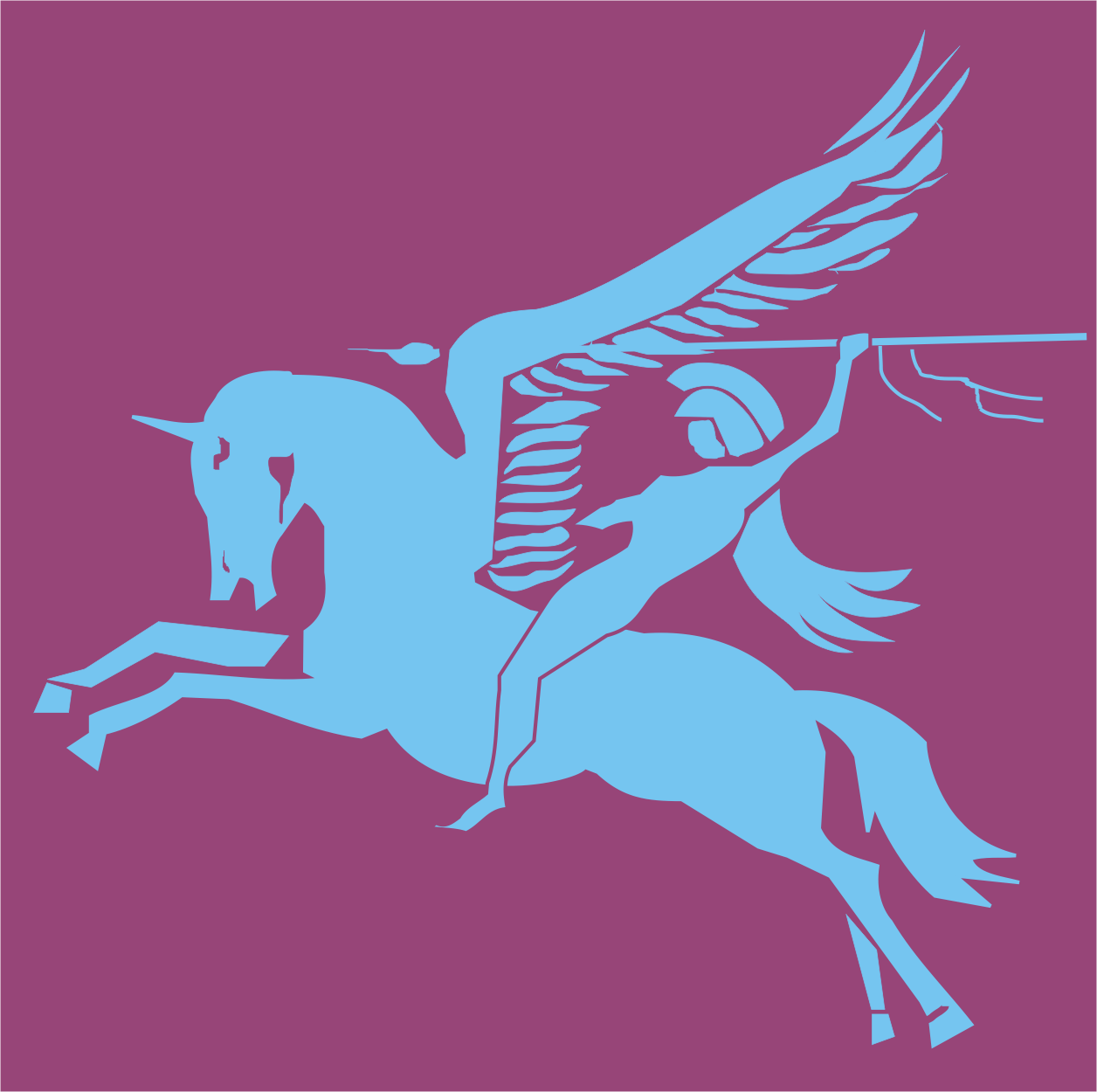
- The emblem of the Second World War British Army Airborne Forces, Bellerophon riding the flying horse Pegasus

The 7th (Light Infantry) Parachute Battalion was an airborne infantry battalion of the Parachute Regiment, formed by the British Army during the Second World War. The battalion was raised in November 1942 by the conversion of the 10th Battalion, Somerset Light Infantry to parachute duties. It was initially assigned to the 3rd Parachute Brigade, part of 1st Airborne Division, but moved to the 5th Parachute Brigade, alongside the 12th and 13th Parachute battalions, of the 6th Airborne Division soon afterwards.

The battalion saw combat on D-Day in Operation Tonga on 6 June 1944, the Battle of the Bulge in December and the River Rhine crossing in March 1945. After the war ended in Europe, the battalion, with the 5th Parachute Brigade, was sent to the Far East to undertake operations against the Japanese Empire. However, the war ended just after the men had started jungle training. Moving by sea, the battalion took part in the reoccupation of Malaya and Singapore. Problems in Java resulted in the battalion being sent to Batavia (Jakarta) to control the unrest, until relieved by a Dutch force.

The battalion then rejoined the 6th Airborne Division in Palestine. Post war army reductions saw the battalion amalgamated with the 17th Parachute Battalion, but still remaining the 7th Parachute Battalion. But further reductions eventually saw the battalion disbanded.

== Formation ==
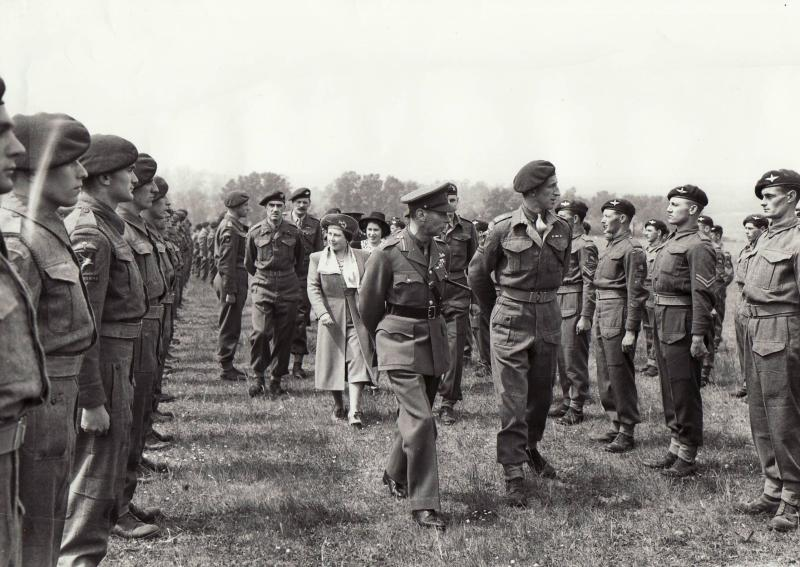
Lieutenant Colonel R. G. Pine-Coffin escorting the King and Queen during an inspection of the 7th (Light Infantry) Parachute Battalion, which Pine-Coffin commanded, 1943.

Impressed by the success of German airborne operations during the Battle of France, the British Prime Minister, Winston Churchill, directed the War Office to investigate the possibility of creating a corps of 5,000 parachute troops. On 22 June 1940, No. 2 Commando was turned over to parachute duties and, on 21 November, redesignated the 11th Special Air Service Battalion, with a parachute and glider wing. It was these men who took part in the first British airborne operation, Operation Colossus, on 10 February 1941. The battalion was later redesignated as the 1st Parachute Battalion. The success of the raid prompted the War Office to expand the existing airborne force, setting up the Airborne Forces Depot and Battle School in Derbyshire in April 1942, and creating the Parachute Regiment as well as converting a number of infantry battalions into airborne battalions in August 1942.

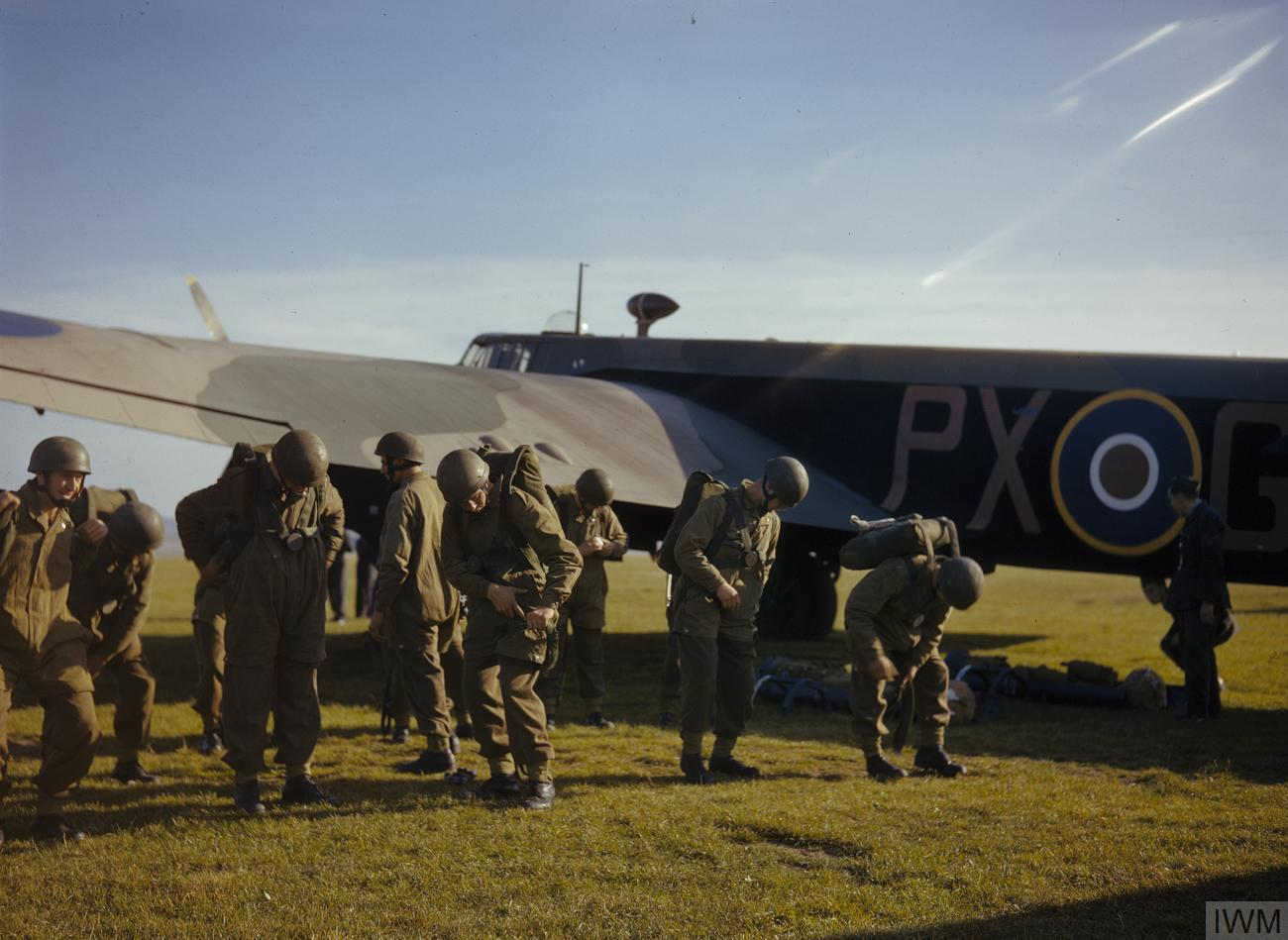
Parachute training

The 7th (Light Infantry) Parachute Battalion was formed, in November 1942, by the conversion of the 10th Battalion, Somerset Light Infantry, a war service battalion created two years earlier, to parachute duties. The battalion was assigned to the 3rd Parachute Brigade, originally part of the 1st Airborne Division but later transferred to the 6th Airborne Division. When the 1st Canadian Parachute Battalion arrived in Britain, it was assigned to the 3rd Parachute Brigade and the 7th Parachute Battalion was transferred to the 5th Parachute Brigade, which was also a part of the 6th Airborne Division.

In 1942, a parachute battalion had an establishment of 556 men in three companies (three platoons each) supported by a 3 inch mortar platoon and a Vickers machine gun platoon. By 1944, a support company was added to command the battalion's heavy weapons. It comprised three platoons: a Mortar Platoon with eight 3-inch mortars, a Machine Gun Platoon with four Vickers machine guns and an Anti-tank Platoon with ten PIAT (Projector, Infantry, Anti-Tank) anti-tank projectors.

== Normandy ==
On 6 June 1944, the 7th Parachute Battalion landed in Normandy. Many men of the battalion were scattered or landed on the wrong drop zone. So badly scattered were they that, by 03:00, Lieutenant Colonel Pine-Coffin in command had only around forty percent of the battalion at the forming up point, although men continued to appear throughout the day. Relatively few of their supply containers had been found, meaning that they possessed few heavy weapons or radio sets. However, the battalion managed to rendezvous with the coup-de-main forces of the 2nd Battalion, Ox and Bucks Light Infantry at the Caen and Orne bridges. They then set up a defensive perimeter against German counter-attacks. The first German assault on the bridges came between 05:00 and 07:00 and consisted of isolated and often uncoordinated attacks by tanks, armoured cars and infantry, which grew in intensity throughout the day. The Luftwaffe attempted to destroy the Caen bridge with a 1,000 lb (450 kg) bomb, which failed to detonate, and two German Navy coastal craft, which attempted to attack the bridge, were also repelled. Despite the ferocity of the attacks, the battalion and the coup-de-main forces were able to hold the bridges until 19:00, when leading elements of the 3rd British Infantry Division arrived and began to relieve the battalion. By midnight, the battalion was being held in reserve behind the 12th Parachute Battalion occupying Le Bas de Ranville and the 13th Parachute Battalion holding Ranville.

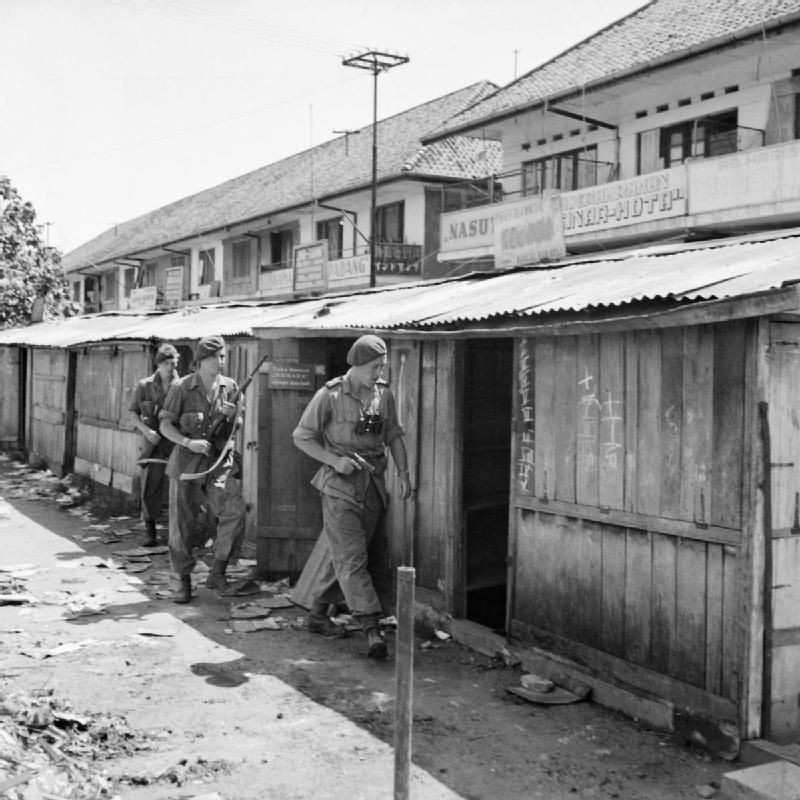
Men of the 7th Battalion, Parachute Regiment, under Lieutenant S Dunsford, on patrol in the Kramat quarter of Batavia (Jakarta), December 1945.

== Ardennes ==
The 6th Airborne Division was called to intervene in the German offensive through the Ardennes on 20 December 1944. On the 29th of that month, they attacked the tip of the German thrust and the 3rd Parachute Brigade was given responsibility for the Rochefort sector, which they took after meeting stiff resistance. After several months of heavy patrolling, in Belgium and, in February, the Netherlands, the Division was withdrawn to England.

== Post Second World War ==
With the war in Europe over, the battalion moved to the Far East with the 5th Parachute Brigade between 1945 and 1946. Thereafter, it returned to the 6th Airborne Division in Palestine and was incorporated into the 17th Parachute Battalion in July 1946 while retaining its name. After the 5th Parachute Brigade was disbanded, the men of the battalion were reallocated among the remainder of the division and the unit re-designated 3rd Parachute Battalion at Itzehoe in July 1948.

== Commanding officers ==
Dates	Name
1942-4	Lt. Col. H.N. Barlow OBE
1944-7	Lt. Col. R.G. Pine-Coffin, DSO, MC
1947	Lt Col. T.C.H. Pearson, DSO
1947-8	Lt Col. P.D. Maud
