= 17th Parachute Battalion (United Kingdom) =

- Cap badge of the Parachute Regiment
- Country: United Kingdom
- Branch: British Army
- Type: Infantry
- Role: Airborne forces
- Size: Battalion
- Part of: 1st Parachute Brigade; 6th Parachute Brigade
- Nickname(s): Red Devils
- Motto(s): Utrinque Paratus (Latin for "Ready for Anything")

Insignia
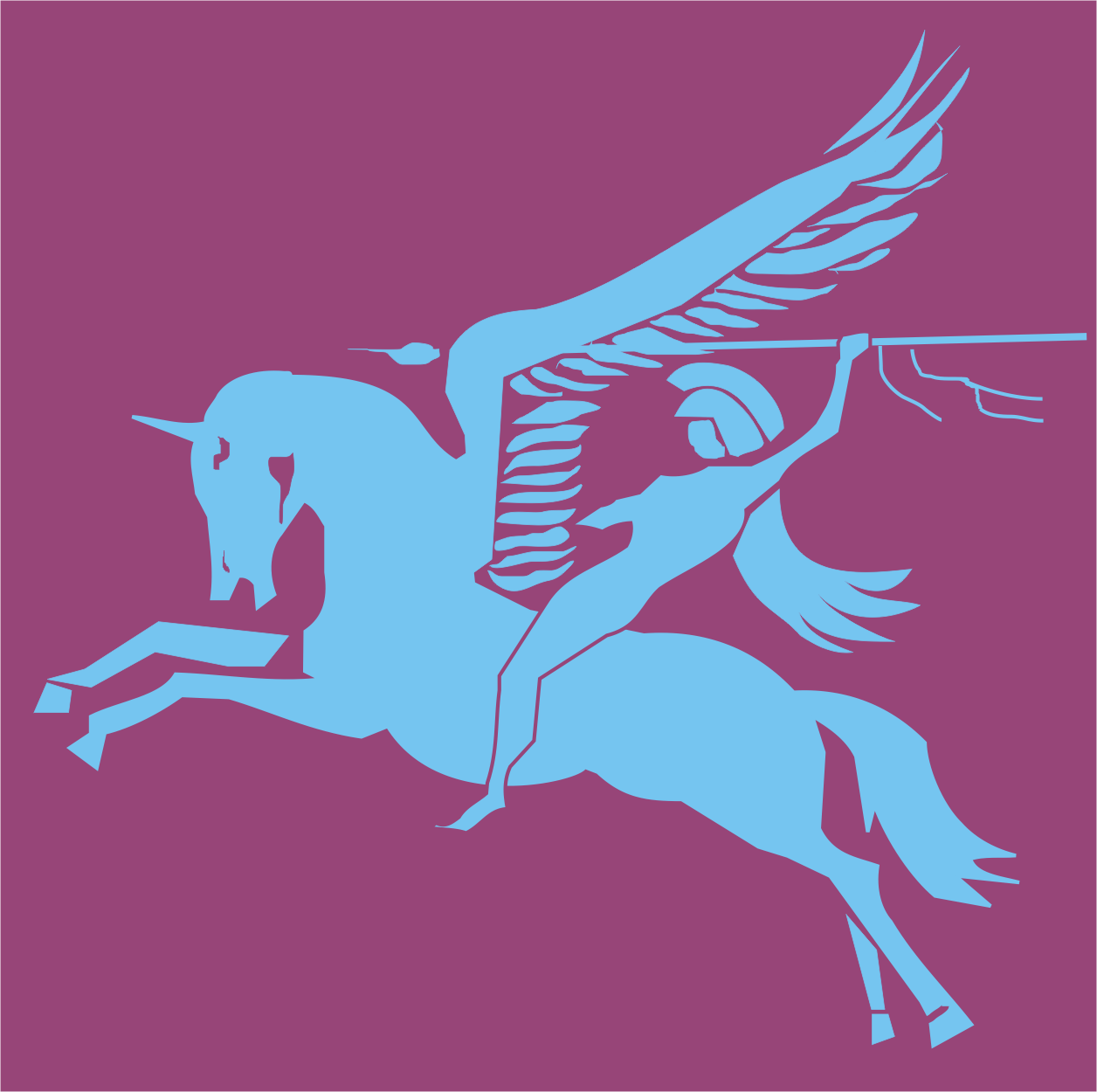
- The emblem of the Second World War British Airborne Forces, Bellerophon riding the flying horse Pegasus

The 17th Parachute Battalion was an airborne infantry battalion of the Parachute Regiment, which was raised by the British Army during the Second World War.

== Regular army ==
The battalion was raised in August 1945 and assigned to the reformed 1st Parachute Brigade. It was posted to Palestine with the 6th Airborne Division later that year. Post war reductions in the army resulted in the battalion being amalgamated with the 7th Parachute Battalion in 1946, keeping the number of the senior battalion.

== Territorial Army ==
In 1947, a Territorial Army battalion was raised from the 9th Battalion Durham Light Infantry. The new battalion, the 17th (Durham Light Infantry) Parachute Battalion (TA), served in the 6th Parachute Brigade, 16th Airborne Division. Defence cuts in 1967 saw the battalion being amalgamated with the 12th/13th Parachute Battalion (which had been formed in 1956 by the merger of the 12th (Yorkshire) and the 13th (Lancashire) battalions) to become the 4th Battalion, Parachute Regiment.
