= James Hill (British Army officer) =

British Army officer (1911–2006)

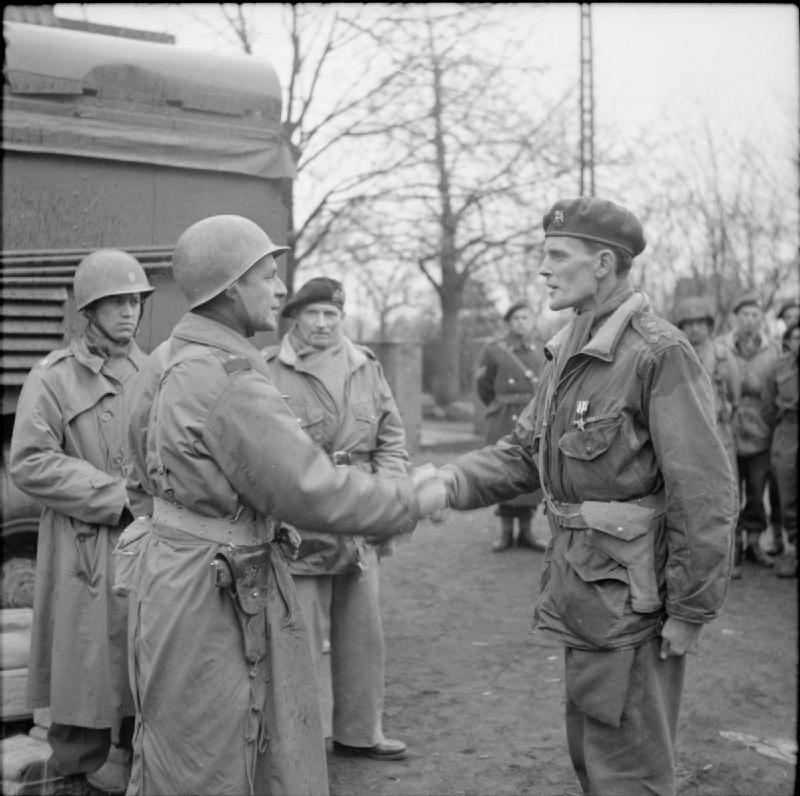
- Major General Matthew Ridgway (left), commanding U.S. XVIII Airborne Corps, decorates Brigadier James Hill with the American Silver Star, March 1945. Pictured also in the middle is Field Marshal Sir Bernard Montgomery.
- Born: 14 March 1911; Bath, Somerset, England
- Died: 16 March 2006 (aged 95); Church Farm Care Home, Cotgrave, Nottingham, England
- Military career
- Allegiance: United Kingdom
- Branch: British Army
- Service years: 1931–1948
- Rank: Brigadier
- Nickname: "Speedy"
- Service number: 52648
- Units: Royal Fusiliers; Parachute Regiment
- Commands: 1st Parachute Battalion; 9th Parachute Battalion; 3rd Parachute Brigade; 1st Parachute Brigade; 4th Parachute Brigade
- Conflicts: Second World War
- Awards: Distinguished Service Order & Two Bars; Military Cross; Silver Star (United States); King Haakon VII Liberty Cross (Norway); Legion of Honour (France)

Brigadier Stanley James Ledger Hill, DSO & Two Bars, MC (14 March 1911 – 16 March 2006) was a British Army officer, who served as commander of the 3rd Parachute Brigade, part of the 6th Airborne Division, during the Second World War.

Born in Bath, Somerset, in 1911, Hill was educated at Marlborough College and the Royal Military College, Sandhurst before joining the British Army in 1931 and being commissioned into the Royal Fusiliers. He commanded a platoon for a short period, and was then attached to the command post of Field Marshal Lord Gort during the Battle of France in May 1940, where he oversaw the evacuation of Brussels as well as the beach at De Panne during the evacuation of Dunkirk. After a brief period of time in Ireland, he volunteered for parachute training and joined the 1st Parachute Battalion, and was its commanding officer when its parent formation, the 1st Parachute Brigade, was deployed to North Africa.

Hill commanded the battalion during its first airborne operation in North Africa, dropping near the towns of Souk el-Arba and Béja, in Tunisia. It secured Beja and then sent out patrols to harass German troops, ambushing a convoy and inflicting numerous German casualties, and defended a bridge at Medjez el Bab, although it was eventually forced to retreat. Hill was wounded during an attack by the battalion on Gue Hill, in which he attempted to capture three Italian tanks using his revolver; the crews of two were successfully subdued without incident, but the third opened fire and hit Hill in the chest several times. He was awarded the Distinguished Service Order (DSO) and the French Legion of Honour for his service in North Africa and then evacuated back to England. There he took command of the 3rd Parachute Brigade in the newly formed 6th Airborne Division, and jumped with the brigade during Operation Tonga, the British airborne landings in Normandy on the night of 5/6 June 1944. After nearly being killed on D-Day, by an aircraft strafing his position, Hill commanded the brigade throughout the rest of the time it was in Normandy, once leading a counter-attack during a German assault, later being awarded the first Bar to his DSO.

After advancing to the Seine, the 6th Airborne Division was withdrawn to England in September 1944, but briefly served in the Ardennes in December during the Battle of the Bulge. Hill then commanded 3rd Parachute Brigade during Operation Varsity, the Allied airborne assault over the River Rhine, where he was nearly killed by a glider containing his own personal Jeep. He then commandeered a motorcycle and rode alongside the brigade as the 6th Airborne Division advanced from the Rhine to the River Elbe, at the end of which he was awarded a second Bar to his DSO as well as the American Silver Star. After the war, he was briefly military governor of Copenhagen, for which he was awarded the King Haakon VII Liberty Cross, and also raised and commanded the 4th Parachute Brigade (Territorial Army). Retiring from the British Army in 1949, he became involved in a number of charities and businesses. James Hill died on 16 March 2006, aged 95.

== Early life ==
Hill was born on 14 March 1911, in Bath, Somerset, the son of Major General Walter Hill. He was educated at Marlborough College, where he was the head of the college's Officer Training Corps, and then attended the Royal Military Academy Sandhurst; there he won the Sword of Honour and became captain of athletics. He joined the British Army in 1931, being commissioned as a 2nd lieutenant into the Royal Fusiliers (City of London regiment), the regiment which his father commanded. He ran the regimental athletic and boxing associations during his service with the regiment, and in 1936 transferred to the Supplementary Reserve in order to marry his first wife, Denys Gunter-Jones. For the next three years he worked as part of his family's ferry company.

== Second World War ==
When the Second World War began in September 1939, Hill was recalled to his regiment and given command of the 2nd Battalion, Royal Fusiliers' advance party when the battalion left for France during the same month. The battalion was assigned to the 12th Infantry Brigade, part of the 4th Infantry Division. He then commanded a platoon for several months, when the battalion was stationed along the Maginot Line, before being promoted to the rank of Captain in January 1940 and joining the staff at Allied Headquarters. The Battle of France began in May 1940, by which time Hill was attached to the command post of Field Marshal Lord Gort; during this period he was involved in planning the evacuation of the civilian population of Brussels, and also carried Gort's dispatches to Calais ordering the withdrawal of the British Expeditionary Force (BEF). At the end of the campaign, he took command of the evacuation of the beach at La Panne, and was on the last destroyer to leave Dunkirk. For these actions, he was awarded the Military Cross. On his return to Britain, he was promoted to Major and travelled to Dublin in the Irish Free State, where he planned for the evacuation of British citizens from the city should German forces land there. When this task was completed, he volunteered for the fledgling Parachute Regiment, part of the British Army's growing airborne forces, and undertook parachute training; when the 1st Parachute Battalion was formed on 15 August 1941, he was appointed as its second-in-command.

The battalion was part of 1st Parachute Brigade, which by mid-1942 had been expanded into 1st Airborne Division under the command of Major-General F.A.M. Browning. In July 1942 the 1st Parachute Battalion was selected to participate in the Dieppe Raid, and got as far as being loaded onto transport aircraft before poor weather cancelled the operation; when the raid was planned for a second time the parachute battalion was removed because their deployment was too dependent on there being good weather on the day of the raid. In mid September, as 1st Airborne Division was coming close to reaching full strength, Browning was informed that Operation Torch, the Allied invasion of North Africa, would take place in November. After being informed that an American airborne unit, the 509th Parachute Infantry Battalion, was to be used during the invasion, Browning successfully advocated for the 1st Parachute Brigade to also be included. He argued that a larger airborne force should be utilised during the invasion, as the large distances and comparatively light opposition would provide a number of opportunities for airborne operations. The War Office and Commander in Chief, Home Forces were won over by the argument, and agreed to detach the brigade from 1st Airborne Division and place it under the command of General Dwight D. Eisenhower, who would command all Allied troops participating in the invasion. After it had been brought to full operational strength, partly by cross posting personnel from the newly formed 2nd Parachute Brigade, and had been provided with sufficient equipment and resources, the brigade departed for North Africa at the beginning of November 1942.

=== North Africa ===
As an insufficient number of transport aircraft were allocated to the brigade, it was only possible to transport the 3rd Parachute Battalion by air. The rest of the brigade arrived at Algiers on 12 November, with some of its stores arriving slightly later. By the evening, reconnaissance parties had travelled to the airfield at Maison Blanche, with the remainder of the brigade following on the morning of 13 November; it was quartered in Maison Blanche, Maison Carree and Rouiba. After several ambitious airborne operations were planned but then cancelled by British First Army, on 14 November it directed that a single parachute battalion would be dropped the next day near Souk el-Arba and Béja; the battalion was to contact French forces at Beja to ascertain whether they would remain neutral, or support the Allies; secure and guard the cross roads and airfield at Soul el Arba; and patrol eastwards to harass German forces. 1st Parachute Battalion was selected for the task, to which Hill objected. The battalion had been forced to unload the vessel carrying its supplies and equipment itself, and had also to arrange its own transportation to Maison Blanche as no drivers were provided at Algiers; when it had arrived at Maison Blanche, it had been subjected to several Luftwaffe air raids that targeted the airfield. Hill argued that as a result his men were exhausted, and he did not believe all of the battalion's equipment could be sorted out within twenty four hours; as such he asked for the operation to be postponed for a short period, but this was denied.

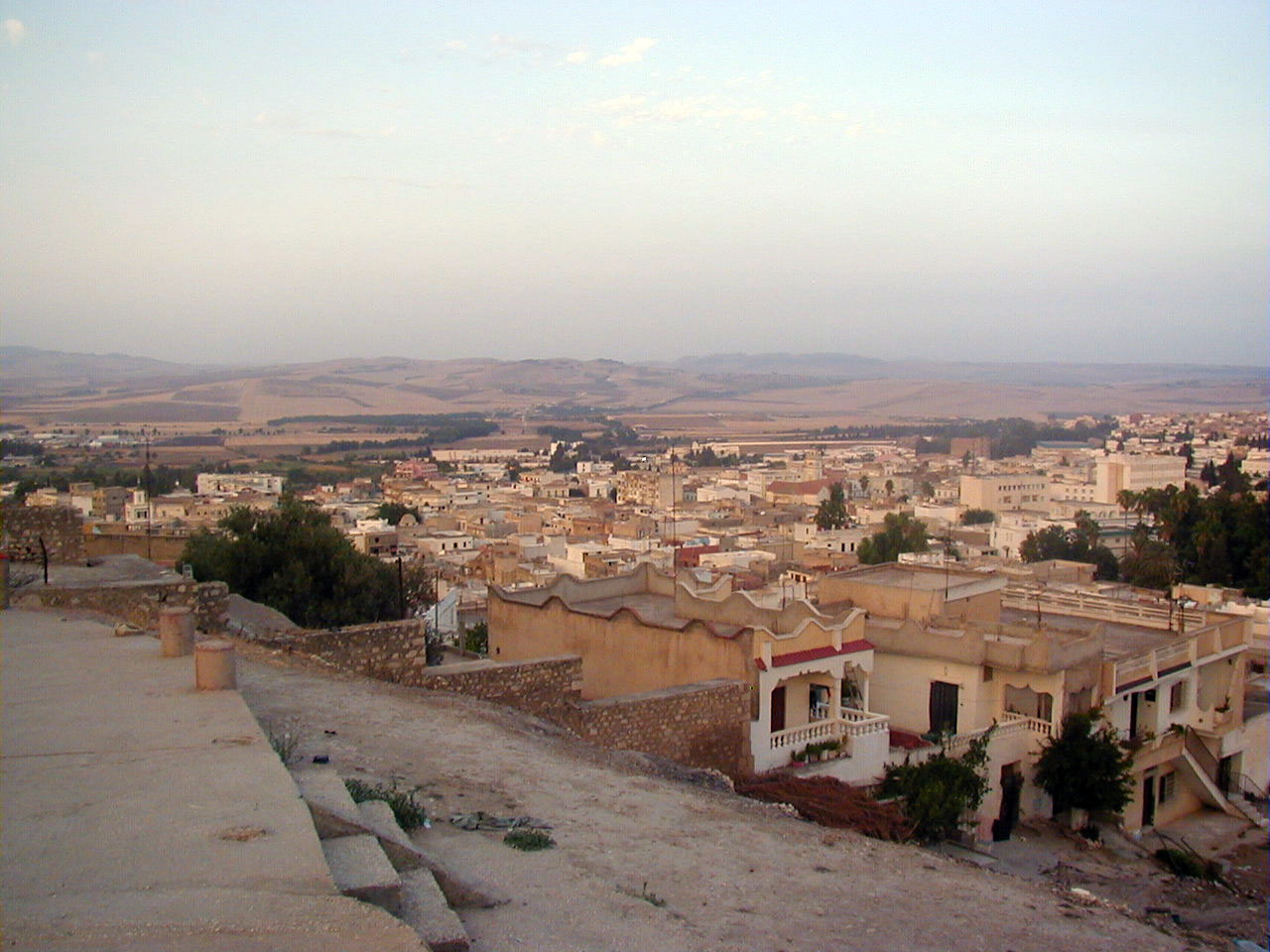
Panoramic view of modern-day Béja.

Hill faced further problems as he planned for the operation. The American pilots of the Dakota transport aircraft that would transport the battalion were inexperienced and had never conducted a parachute drop before, and there was no time for any training or exercises. There were also no photos of the airfield or the surrounding areas, and only a single, small scale map available for navigation. To ensure that the aircraft found the drop zone and delivered the battalion accurately, Hill sat in the cockpit of the leading Dakota and assisted the pilot. The Dakotas were escorted by four American P-38 Lightning fighters, which engaged and drove off two roving German fighters, but as the Dakotas approached the Tunisian border they encountered thick clouds and were forced to turn back, landing at Maison Blanche at 11:00. It was decided that the battalion would conduct the operation the next day, which allowed the paratroopers to rest for a night. 1st Parachute Battalion took off on the morning of 16 November, and enjoyed excellent weather that allowed the transport aircraft to drop the battalion accurately around the airfield at Souk el Arba. Most of the paratroopers landed successfully, but one man was killed when his rigging line twisted around his neck mid drop, throttling him; one officer broke his leg on landing, and four men were wounded when a Sten gun was accidentally fired. The battalion's second in command, Major Alastair Pearson, remained at the airfield with a small detachment that collected the airborne equipment and supervised the burial of the casualty.

Meanwhile, Hill led the rest of the battalion, approximately 525 strong, in some commandeered trucks towards the town of Béja, an important road and railway centre approximately forty miles from the airfield. The battalion arrived at approximately 18:00 and was welcomed by the local French garrison, 3,000 strong, which Hill persuaded to cooperate with the paratroopers; in order to give the garrison and any German observers the impression that he possessed a larger force than he actually did, Hill arranged for the battalion to march through the town several times, wearing different headgear and holding different equipment each time. A short time after the battalion entered Béja, German aircraft arrived and bombed the town, although they caused little damage and no casualties. The next day, 'S' Company was sent with a detachment of engineers to the village of Sidi N'Sir, about twenty miles away; they were to contact the local French forces, believed to be pro British, and harass German forces. The detachment found the village and made contact with the French, who allowed them to pass through towards the town of Mateur; by nightfall the force had not reached the town, and decided to encamp for the night. At dawn a German convoy of armoured cars passed the detachment, and it was decided to set an ambush for the convoy if it returned, with anti-tank mines being laid on the road and a mortar and Bren guns being set up in concealed positions. When the convoy returned at approximately 10:00 the leading vehicle struck a mine and exploded, blocking the road, and the other vehicles were disabled with mortar fire, Gammon bombs and the remaining anti tank mines. A number of Germans were killed and the rest taken prisoner, with two paratroopers being slightly wounded. The detachment returned to Béja with prisoners and several slightly damaged armoured cars. After the success of the ambush, Hill sent a second patrol to harass local German forces, but it was withdrawn after it encountered a larger German force that inflicted several British casualties; Béja was also bombed by Stuka divebombers, inflicting civilian casualties and destroying a number of houses.

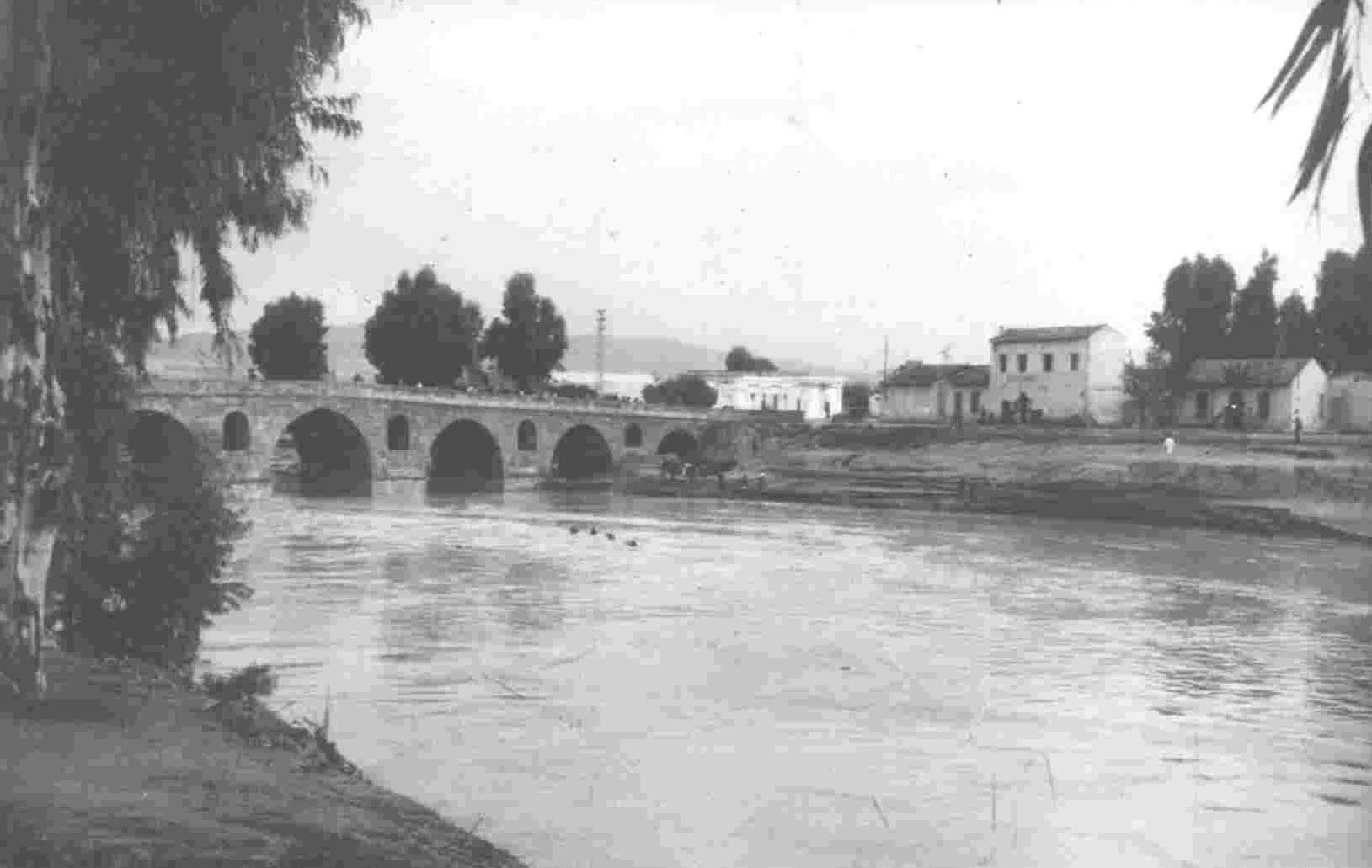
The bridge at Medjez el Bab.

On 19 November, Hill visited the commanding officer of the French forces guarding a vital bridge at Medjez el Bab, and warned him that any attempt by German forces to cross the bridge would be opposed by the battalion. Hill attached 'R' Company to the French forces to ensure the bridge was not captured. German forces soon arrived at the bridge, and their commanding officer demanded that they be allowed to take control of the bridge and cross it to attack the British positions. The French rejected the German demands, and in conjunction with 'R' Company repelled subsequent German attacks that lasted several hours. The battalion was reinforced by the U.S. 175th Field Artillery Battalion and elements of the Derbyshire Yeomanry, but, despite fierce resistance, the German forces proved to be too strong, and by 04:30 on 20 November the Allied forces had yielded the bridge and the surrounding area to the Germans. Two days later, Hill received information that a strong Italian force, which included a number of tanks, was stationed at Gue Hill. Hill decided to attack the force and attempt to disable the tanks, and the following night moved the battalion, less a small guard detachment that remained at Béja, to Sidi N'Sir where it linked up with a force of French Senegalese infantry. Hill decided that the battalion's section of 3 inch mortars would cover 'R' and 'S' Companies as they advanced up Gue Hill and attacked the Italian force, while a small force of sappers would mine the road at the rear of the hill to ensure the Italian tanks could not retreat.

The battalion arrived at the hill without incident and began to prepare for the attack; however, just prior to the beginning of the attack there were several loud explosions from the rear of the hill. The anti tank grenades carried by the sappers had accidentally detonated, killing all but two of them. The battalion lost the element of surprise, and Hill immediately ordered the two companies to advance up the hill. The force reached the top and engaged a mixed force of German and Italian soldiers, who were assisted by three light tanks. Hill drew his revolver, and with his adjutant and a small group of paratroopers advanced on the tanks, firing shots through their observation ports in an attempt to persuade the crews to surrender. This tactic worked on two tanks, but upon reaching the third tank Hill and his men were fired upon by the tank's crew; Hill was shot three times in the chest and his adjutant wounded, although the tank crew were swiftly dispatched with small arms fire. Hill survived because of prompt medical treatment, and was replaced as commander of the battalion by Major Pearson, who supervised the routing of the rest of the German and Italian soldiers.

=== Normandy ===
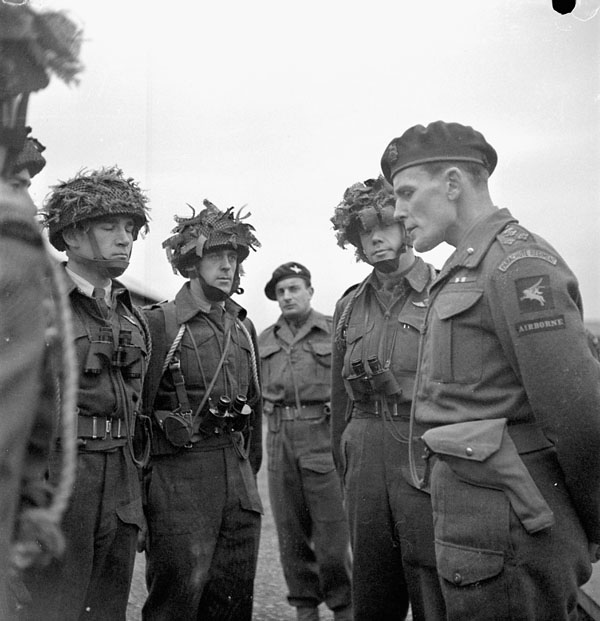
Hill (right) briefing Canadian paratroopers, 6 December 1943.

After his injuries were treated, Hill was evacuated to a hospital in North Africa to recover; although forbidden to do so, he often exercised by climbing out of the window of his hospital ward at night. For his actions in North Africa, he was awarded the Distinguished Service Order (DSO), which "paid tribute to the brilliant handling of his force and his complete disregard of personal danger," as well as the French Légion d'honneur. By February 1943 he had recovered from his injuries, and was flown back to England where he met up with Brigadier Gerald W. Lathbury, commander of the newly raised 3rd Parachute Brigade. The War Office had authorised the raising of the brigade on 5 November 1942, comprising the 7th, 8th and 9th Parachute Battalions, all converted infantry battalions. The 9th Parachute Battalion was in need of a commanding officer and Lathbury offered the job to Hill, who accepted. His first action was to send the entire unit on a forced march, at the end of which he announced that the battalion would "work a six and a half day week" with Sunday afternoons off, until it was well-trained and fit. The 3rd Parachute Brigade was initially attached to the 1st Airborne Division, but in April 1943 Lathbury was given command of 1st Parachute Brigade, which departed with 1st Airborne Division at the end of April for the Mediterranean theatre and Operation Husky, the invasion of Sicily. The 3rd Parachute Brigade was detached from the division in March and remained in England, and on 23 April it was transferred into the newly formed 6th Airborne Division with Hill as the brigade's new commander. On 11 August, 1st Canadian Parachute Battalion was attached to the 3rd Parachute Brigade; although meant to be assigned to the newly formed 5th Parachute Brigade, also attached to the 6th Airborne Division, it instead replaced the 7th Parachute Battalion, which was transferred to the new parachute brigade.

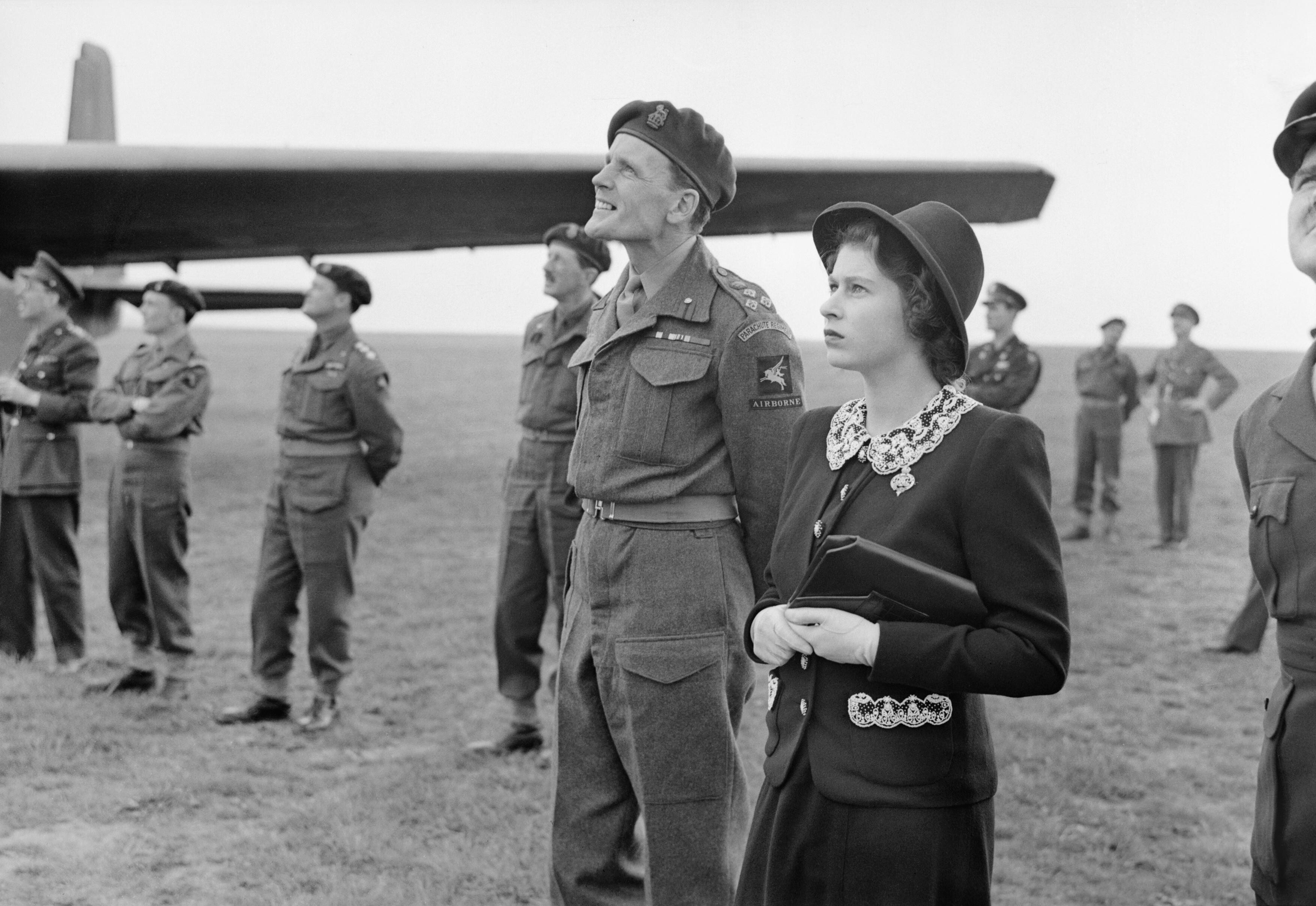
Hill (centre) and Princess Elizabeth watch a paradrop during the latter's visit to airborne forces in England in the run-up to D-Day, 1944.

The 6th Airborne Division, under the command of Major-General Richard Nelson Gale, was fully mobilised by late December 1943, with orders to prepare for airborne operations to be conducted during mid-1944. The division's first airborne operation would also be the first time it saw combat, conducting Operation Tonga, the British airborne landings in Normandy on the night of 5/6 June, D-Day. It was tasked with guarding the left flank of the British amphibious landings by securing the area east of the city of Caen, capturing a number of bridges that spanned several rivers and canals, and then preventing any Axis forces from advancing on the British beaches. The 3rd Parachute Brigade was given several tasks to accomplish. The 9th Parachute Battalion, commanded by Lieutenant Colonel Terence Otway, was to assault and destroy the Merville Gun Battery, as well as capturing high ground and setting up roadblocks. The 1st Canadian Parachute Battalion was to destroy two bridges, and the 8th Parachute Battalion had the task of destroying three bridges. When the operation began, the brigade suffered from a combination of poor navigation by the pilots of their C-47 Dakota transport aircraft, heavy cloud cover and incorrectly marked drop zones, which led to all of its units being scattered over a wide area; Hill himself was dropped with several sticks from the 1st Canadian and 9th Parachute Battalions near the River Dives. He landed in a submerged river bank approximately half a mile from Cabourg, and was forced to wade through four feet of water and a number of flooded irrigation ditches before reaching dry land; the same flooded areas claimed the lives of a number of paratroopers from his brigade.

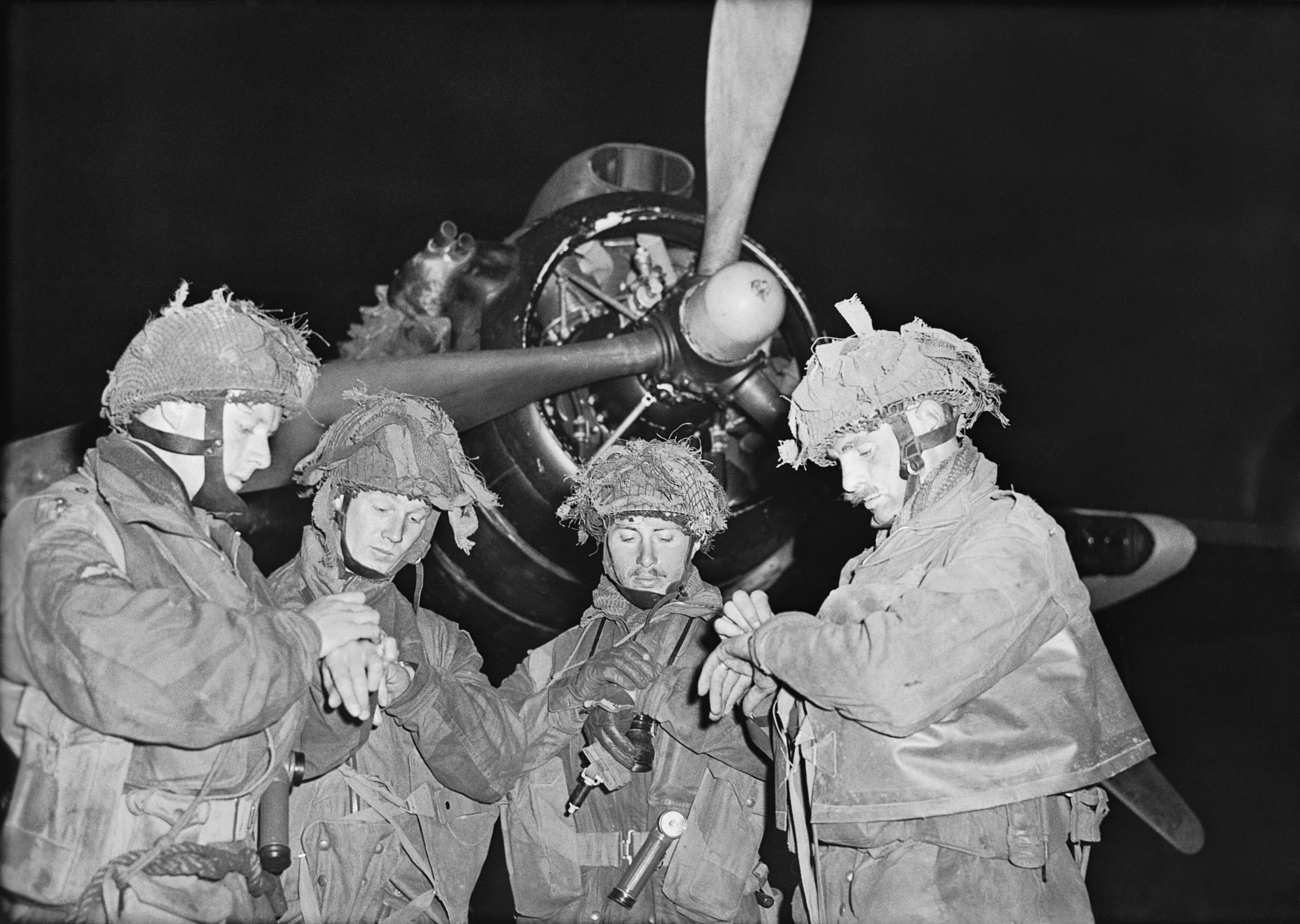
Pathfinders synchronising their watches in front of an Armstrong Whitworth Albemarle.

Collecting up a number of his men, he headed for the town of Sallenelles, where he hoped to find out how the 9th Parachute Battalion had fared assaulting the Merville Battery. En route, however, he and his party were strafed by low-flying German aircraft, forcing the paratroopers to dive for cover; when the aircraft had departed Hill stood up again, finding that he had been wounded in the buttocks and the officer next to him had been killed. Most of the other men had either been killed or wounded during the attack, leaving only himself and the commander of his headquarters defence platoon; once first aid had been administered to the wounded, Hill continued on and finally managed reach Ranville, where the headquarters of the General Officer Commanding (GOC), Major-General Gale, had been set up. After being informed by Gale that his brigade had successfully completed its objectives, Hill had his wound tended to, and then travelled to his own headquarters; there he found Lieutenant Colonel Pearson in temporary command, who informed him that many the brigade's staff had been killed during the drop. By 00:00 on the night of 6/7 June, the entire division was fully deployed on the eastern flank of the invasion beaches. The 3rd Parachute Brigade was holding a 4-mile (6.4 km) front, with the 9th Parachute Battalion at Le Plein, 1st Canadian Parachute Battalion at Les Mesneil and the 8th Parachute Battalion in the southern part of the Bois de Bavent.

For the rest of its time in Normandy the division acted in an infantry role. From 7 June until 16 August, it first consolidated and then expanded its bridgehead. The 3rd Parachute Brigade was responsible for a section of front around the Chateau Saint Come and a nearby manor, with the latter being used as the brigade's primary defensive position. The brigade was positioned next to the 1st Special Service Brigade, and from 7 June onwards German pressure rapidly increased against both brigade's positions, with a number of attacks being repelled between then and 10 June. On 10 June the decision was taken to expand the bridgehead to the east of the River Orne, with the 6th Airborne Division tasked with achieving this; however, it was deemed not to be strong enough, and the 5th Battalion, Black Watch was placed under the 3rd Parachute Brigade's command; the battalion launched an attack on the town of Breville on 11 June, but was met with extremely heavy resistance and was repulsed after suffering a number of casualties. The next day 3rd Parachute Brigade's entire front was subjected to fierce artillery bombardment and assaults by German tanks and infantry, with the Germans particularly focusing on the positions held by 9th Parachute Battalion. Both the 9th Parachute Battalion and the remnants of the 5th Black Watch defended the Chateau Saint Come but were gradually forced to retreat. Lieutenant Colonel Otway informed brigade headquarters, some 400 metres (1,300 ft) away, that his battalion would be unable to hold its ground for much longer; upon hearing this message, Brigadier Hill gathered together forty paratroopers from the 1st Canadian Parachute Battalion and led a counter-attack that forced the German troops to withdraw.

German attempts to breach the 9th Parachute Battalion's positions did not end until 12 June, and Hill stated that the period 7–12 June were "five of the toughest days fighting I saw in five years of war." It was during this period that Hill was awarded the first Bar to his Distinguished Service Order, after supervising an assault by 12th Parachute Battalion on the town of Breville; the town dominated a long ridge near the Allied bridgehead, from which the German 346th Infantry Division launched repeated attacks. From then on until mid-August the division remained in static positions, holding the left flank of the Allied bridgehead and conducting vigorous patrolling. Finally, on 7 August the division was ordered to prepare to move over to the offensive, and on the night of 16/17 August it began to advance against stiff German opposition, its ultimate objective being the mouth of the River Seine (see 6th Airborne Division advance to the River Seine). Hill's 3rd Parachute Brigade led the division's advance, being held up until nightfall at the village of Goustranville, but then securing several bridges and allowing the 5th Parachute Brigade to pass through its positions and continue the division's advance. The brigade remained around the Dives canal for several days, and then on 21 August it advanced towards Pont L'Eveque, but was stalled by German infantry and armour near Annebault until 8th Parachute Battalion secured the village. Fighting continued to be fierce, but by 24 August the entire division had advanced across the River Touques. After another three days of reorganising and patrolling, the division's time in Normandy came to an end; in nine days it had advanced 45 miles, captured 400 square miles (1,000 km^{2}) of occupied territory and taken prisoner over 1,000 German soldiers. Its casualties for the period were 4,457, of which 821 would be killed, 2,709 wounded and 927 missing. It was finally withdrawn from the frontline in the last days of August, and embarked for England at the beginning of September.

=== Ardennes ===
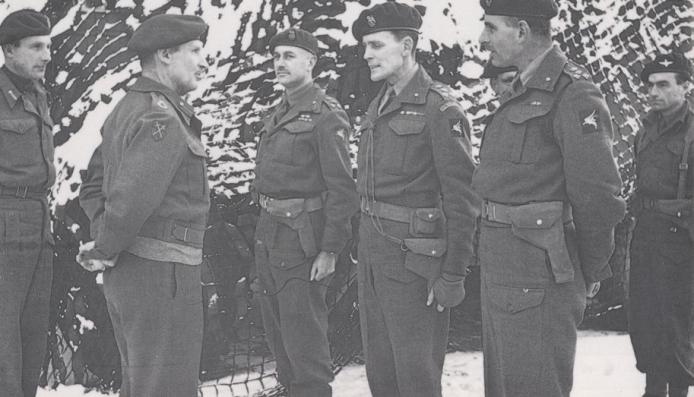
From left to right: Major General Eric Bols, Field Marshal Bernard Montgomery, Brigadiers Edwin Flavell, James Hill, Nigel Poett, and Lieutenant Colonel Napier Crookenden.

On 16 December 1944, the Germans launched a huge offensive in the Ardennes forest, with the German objective to split British and American forces apart and capture the port of Antwerp, an important logistical base for the Allies. The initial assaults were extremely successful, creating a salient some fifty miles wide and forty-five miles deep, and by 23 December German units were advancing towards Dinant. American resistance was fierce, however, and blunted German advances in several areas, particularly the U.S. 101st Airborne Division around the town of Bastogne. By Christmas Day the offensive had been halted and contained, and an Allied counter-offensive began. Although the majority of the troops committed belonged to the American First and Third Armies, British XXX Corps also participated, with the British 6th Airborne Division as one of its leading divisions. The division had been in England since the beginning of September, and had been due to go on Christmas leave only days before the counter-offensive began; however, it was quickly transported to the Ardennes, arriving on the night of 24 December. By 26 December the 6th Airborne Division, now commanded by Major-General Eric Bols, had positioned itself between the towns of Dinant and Namur, and on 29 December it advanced against the German salient, with the 3rd Parachute Brigade, under James Hill, occupying an area around Rochefort.

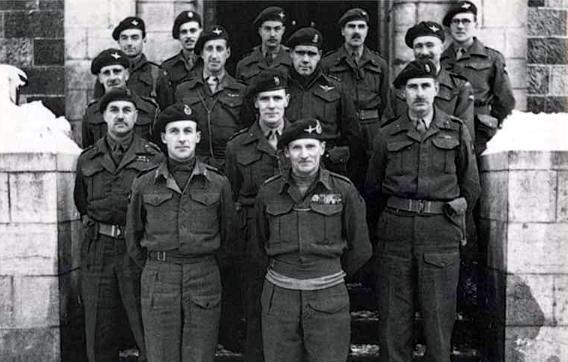
Senior officers of the 6th Airborne Division in the Ardennes, January 1945. Stood behind Field Marshal Montgomery is Brigadier James Hill.

When the German offensive had begun, Hill had been in hospital, undergoing reconstructive plastic surgery; this meant that he was unable to join the 3rd Parachute Brigade for two days. When he had recovered, however, he and his batman were flown to the Ardennes and he was able to rejoin the brigade. The 5th Parachute Brigade launched several attacks against German positions in the village of Bure, which resulted in heavy British casualties, and both brigades conducted a large number of offensive patrols. The 3rd Parachute Brigade did not see any action, as those German units occupying positions opposite to it withdrew without fighting. By the end of January, however, the division was transferred back to the Netherlands and set up new positions along the Maas river, where it conducted more patrolling against elements of the German 7th Parachute Division, which held positions on the other side of the Maas. These operations came to an end in late February, when the 6th Airborne Division was withdrawn back to England to prepare for a major airborne operation in March.

=== Rhine ===
On 24 March 1945 Operation Varsity began, an airborne operation to aid in the establishment of a bridgehead on the east bank of the River Rhine which involved the British 6th Airborne Division and the U.S. 17th Airborne Division, under Major General William Miley. Varsity was the airborne component of Operation Plunder, in which the British Second Army, under Lieutenant-General Miles C. Dempsey, and the U.S. Ninth Army, under Lieutenant General William Simpson, crossed the Rhine at Rees, Wesel, and an area south of the Lippe Canal. Both divisions would be dropped near the town of Hamminkeln, and were tasked with a number of objectives: they were to seize the Diersfordter Wald, a forest that overlooked the Rhine, including a road linking several towns together; several bridges over a smaller waterway, the River Issel, were to be seized to facilitate the advance; and the town of Hamminkeln was to be captured. The 6th Airborne Division was specifically tasked with securing the northern portion of the airborne bridgehead, including Hamminkeln, a section of high ground to the east of Bergen, and several bridges over the River Issel. Hill's 3rd Parachute Brigade was to drop at the north-eastern corner of the Diersfordterwald forest and clear the western portion of the forest. It would then seize a hill known as the Schneppenberg, secure a road junction near Bergen and eventually link up with the 5th Parachute Brigade.

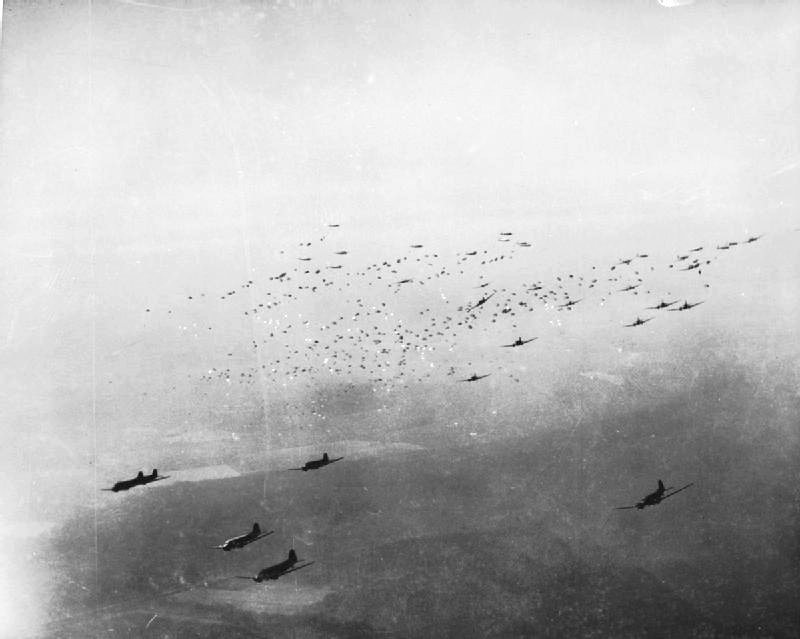
C-47 transport aircraft drop hundreds of paratroopers as part of Operation Varsity.

The 3rd Parachute Brigade dropped nine minutes later than planned, but otherwise landed accurately on drop zone 'A'. Hill landed near to the Diersfordterwald forest, which was occupied by German soldiers "who are switched-on people," killing a number of paratroopers whose parachutes became tangled up in the trees. His brigade headquarters was positioned by a copse which was supposed to have been immediately cleared, but when he arrived it was still occupied by German troops; Hill immediately ordered a company commander of the 8th Parachute Battalion to clear the copse. The officer did so, but was killed in the process. Hill then moved his headquarters to the copse, but was then nearly killed by an approaching glider which barely managed to pull up in time, landing in the trees above him; upon investigation, Hill discovered that it contained his batman and personal Jeep, which took some time to lower down safely. The brigade suffered a number of casualties as it engaged the German forces in the Diersfordter Wald, but by 11:00 hours the drop zone was all but completely clear of enemy forces and all battalions of the brigade had formed up. The key town of Schnappenberg was captured by the 9th Parachute Battalion in conjunction with the 1st Canadian Parachute Battalion, the latter unit having lost its commanding officer to German small-arms fire only moments after he had landed. Despite taking casualties the brigade cleared the area of German forces, and by 13:45 Hill could report that the brigade had secured all of its objectives.

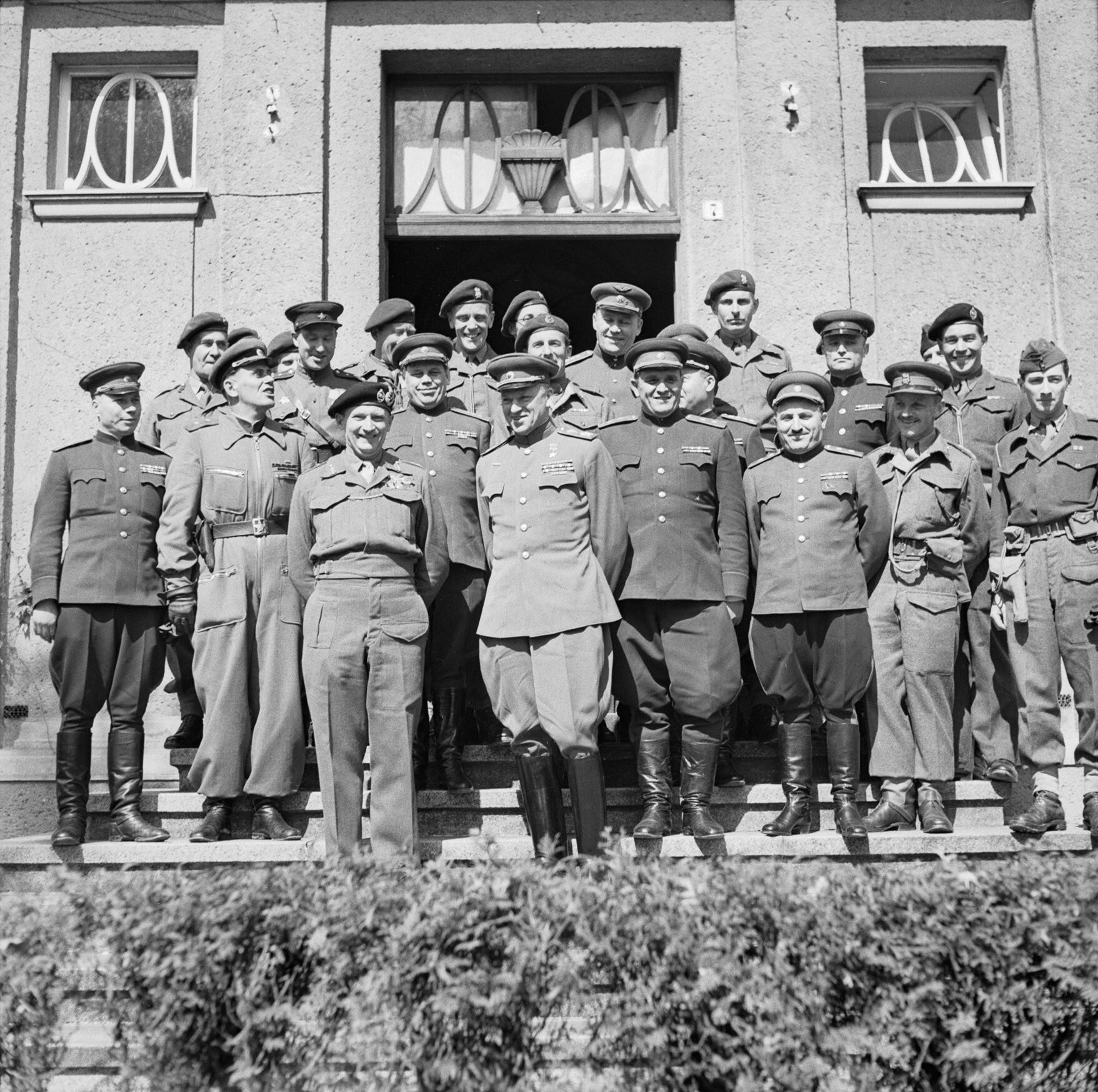
The Russian Marshal Konstantin Rokossovsky with Field Marshal Sir Bernard Montgomery and their respective Chiefs of Staff at the British 6th Airborne Division HQ at Wismar, where the first link up between British and Russian forces took place on 28 April. Montgomery and Rokossovsky are in the front row. Brigadier James Hill is stood two ranks behind Rokossovsky, while Brigadier Nigel Poett stands in the same row as Hill, furthest from the right while Major General Eric Bols stands directly behind Rokkosovsky.

With Varsity a success, the 6th Airborne Division was ordered by Major General Matthew Ridgway, commander of U.S. XVIII Airborne Corps, to advance eastwards. It was supported by the 6th Guards Tank Brigade, and many of the airborne troops used unconventional transport during the advance, including captured German staff cars, prams and even horses. Hill requisitioned a motorcycle for his batman and travelled alongside the 3rd Parachute Brigade as it advanced; at one point his batman stopped the motorcycle and relieved a captured German colonel of his binoculars before driving off again. Hill disapproved of battlefield looting and admonished his batman, although eventually relented by stating "If you can get me a pair [as well], you can keep them!" At midnight, 27/28 March the division came under the control of British VIII Corps, commanded by Lieutenant-General Evelyn Barker, and became part of the general Allied advance through Germany towards the Baltic Sea, with the 3rd Parachute Brigade as the division's leading unit. German resistance continued to be heavy, but the division managed to advance at a rapid pace despite this, with the brigade at one point advancing fifteen miles in twenty-four hours, with eighteen of those being spent in combat. By early April the 6th Airborne reached the River Weser, with the brigade approaching it near the town of Minden, accompanied by armoured support; as it did so, the brigade found itself moving parallel to several German tanks, with Hill sitting on the rear of one of the British tanks. Both sides opened fire, but did little damage, the two German tanks managing to outpace the brigade.

The brigade continued its fast pace of advance, with Hill continuing to ride pillion on his motorcycle, and by 23 April it had reached the River Elbe, having advanced 103 miles in fourteen days; the division had captured more than 19,000 prisoners during this period. After crossing the Elbe, the division once again came under the command of U.S. XVIII Airborne Corps, with General Ridgway informing Major General Bols that it was vital the division reach the port of Wismar before the approaching Russian Army did, to ensure that Denmark was not occupied by the Soviet Union. Although the 5th Parachute Brigade was ordered to lead the division's advance, Hill was determined to reach Wismar first; after an extremely rapid advance he succeeded, with troops from the 1st Canadian Parachute Battalion being the first to enter Wismar, beating an advancing Russian tank column by only a few miles. A few days later, on 7 May 1945, Germany surrendered and the war in Europe came to an end. Hill was awarded a second Bar to his DSO for his command of the 3rd Parachute Brigade during its advance from the Rhine to the Elbe, as well as the American Silver Star.

== Post-war career ==
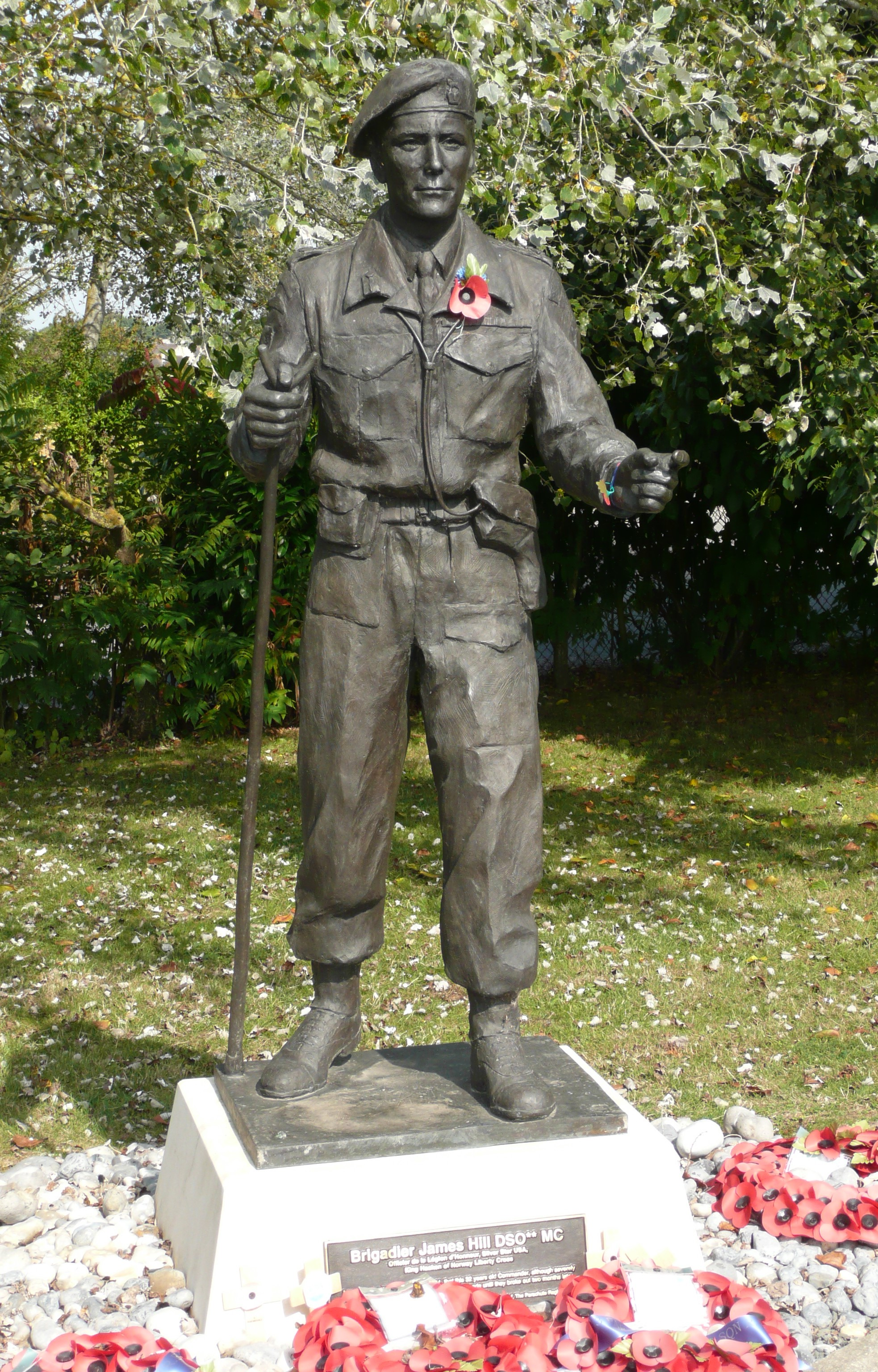
Memorial at the Pegasus Bridge Museum, Ranville

In May 1945 Hill served as military governor of Copenhagen, for which he was awarded the King Haakon VII Liberty Cross, and then assumed command of the 1st Parachute Brigade and oversaw its demobilisation. He retired from the British Army in July 1945, although he continued to serve as an officer in the Territorial Army, raising the 4th Parachute Brigade (Territorial Army) in 1947 and serving as its commanding officer until 1949. After standing down as commander of the brigade, Hill served on the board of a number of companies, including Lloyds Bank, the Associated Coal and Wharf Companies, and Powell Duffryn of Canada. Hill was an avid birdwatcher, with a particular claim to fame for being only the second person to discover a cuckoo's egg in the nest of a whinchat. He also helped to set up the Parachute Regiment Association and the Airborne Forces Security fund, acting as a trustee of the latter organisation for thirty years and chairman for five years. Hill married for a second time, wedding Joan Patricia Haywood in 1986. On 6 June 2004 he attended the 60th Anniversary of the Normandy landings, and a bronze statue of him was unveiled at Le Mesnil crossroads by Charles, Prince of Wales, Colonel-in-Chief of The Parachute Regiment. He died on 16 March 2006, two days after his 95th birthday. He is survived by his second wife and a daughter from the first marriage, Gillian Bridget Sanda.

== Awards and decorations ==
- Military Cross (1940)
- Distinguished Service Order (First Award, 1943)
- Legion of Honour (France, 1943)
- First Bar to the Distinguished Service Order (1943)
- Second Bar to the Distinguished Service Order (1945)
- Silver Star Medal (United States, 1945)
- King Haakon VII Freedom Cross (Norway, 1945)
- 1939–1945 Star (1945)
- Africa Star (1945)
- France and Germany Star (1945)
- Defence Medal (United Kingdom) (1945)
- War Medal 1939–1945 (1945)
- 125th Anniversary of the Confederation of Canada Medal

== Bibliography ==
- Atkinson, Rick (2002). An Army At Dawn: The War in North Africa 1942–1943. Henry Holt & Company LLC. ISBN 0-8050-7448-1.
- Dover, Major Victor (1981). The Sky Generals. Cassell. ISBN 0-304-30480-8.
- Harclerode, Peter (2005). Wings Of War – Airborne Warfare 1918–1945. Weidenfeld & Nicolson. ISBN 0-304-36730-3.
- Harclerode, Peter (2010). Fighting Brigadier : The Life of Brigadier James Hill DSO** MC. Pen and Sword Books. ISBN 978-1848842144.
- Otway, Lieutenant-Colonel T.B.H. (1990). The Second World War 1939–1945 Army – Airborne Forces. Imperial War Museum. ISBN 0-901627-57-7.
- Saunders, Hilary St. George (1972). The Red Beret – The Story Of The Parachute Regiment 1940–1945. White Lion Publishers Limited. ISBN 0-85617-823-3.
- Thompson, Major-General Julian (1990). Ready for Anything: The Parachute Regiment at War. Fontana. ISBN 0-00-637505-7.
- Tugwell, Maurice (1971). Airborne To Battle – A History Of Airborne Warfare 1918–1971. William Kimber & Co Ltd. ISBN 0-7183-0262-1.
