= List of Légion d'honneur recipients by name (O) =

The French government gives out the Legion of Honour awards, to both French and foreign nationals, based on a recipient's exemplary services rendered to France, or to the causes supported by France. This award is divided into five distinct categories (in ascending order), i.e. three ranks: Knight, Officer, Commander, and two titles: Grand Officer and Grand Cross. Knight is the most common and is awarded for either at least 20 years of public service or acts of military or civil bravery. The rest of the categories have a quota for the number of years of service in the category below before they can be awarded. The Officer rank requires a minimum of eight years as a Knight, and the Commander, the highest civilian category for a non-French citizen, requires a minimum of five years as an Officer. The Grand Officer and the Grand Cross are awarded only to French citizens, and each requires three years' service in their respective immediately lower rank. The awards are traditionally published and promoted on 14 July.

The following is a non-exhaustive list of recipients of the Legion of Honour awards, since the first ceremony in May 1803. 2,550 individuals can be awarded the insignia every year. The total number of awards is close to 1 million (estimated at 900,000 in 2021, including over 3,000 Grand Cross recipients), with some 92,000 recipients alive today. Only until 2008 was gender parity achieved amongst the yearly list of recipients, with the total number of women recipients since the award's establishment being only 59 at the end of the second French empire and only 26,000 in 2021.

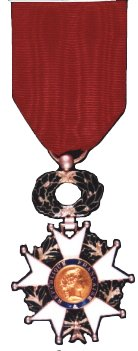

Recipient	Dates (birth – death)	General work, and reason for the award	Award Category (Date)
Christophe-Philippe Oberkampf	1738 – 1815	French naturalized German industrialist	TBA (20 June 1806)
Victoria Ocampo	1890 – 1979	Argentine intellectual, publisher, writer and critic.	TBA
Michel Ocelot	1943 – Present	French writer, designer, storyboard artist and director of animated films and television programs and a former president of the International Animated Film Association.	Knight (23 October 2009)
Brian O'Connell			TBA
Richard O'Connor	1889 – 1981	Senior British Army officer who fought in both the First and Second World Wars	TBA
François-Joseph Offenstein	1760 – 1837	French general and military commander during the Revolutionary and Napoleonic Wars.	TBA
Henri O'Kelly	1859 – 1938	Franco-Irish composer, pianist, organist and choir director, based in Paris.	Knight (1931)
Joseph O'Kelly	1828 – 1885	Franco-Irish composer, pianist and choral conductor. Known as the most prominent member of a family of Irish musicians in 19th- and early 20th-century France.	Knight (1881)
Olav V of Norway	1903 – 1991	King of Norway	Grand Cross
Laurence Olivier	1907 – 1989	English actor and director	TBA
Joseph Francis Olliffe	1808 – 1869	Irish-born British physician.	Knight (1846); Officer (1855)
John O'Neill	1897 – 1942	Sergeant, World War I, V.C., M.M. Soldier in the Prince of Wales's Leinster Regiment (Royal Canadians)	TBA
Terence O'Reilly		Irish Rebel who fought in the 1798 Rebellion in Wicklow, Wexford and Dublin and under Napoleon at Austerlitz.	TBA
Mathieu Orfila	1787 – 1853	Spanish toxicologist and chemist. Known as the founder of the science of toxicology.	TBA
Philippe Antoine d'Ornano	1784 – 1863	French soldier and political figure (Marshal of France)	Grand Cross
Sherard Osborn	1822 – 1875	Royal Navy admiral and Arctic explorer	TBA
Władysław Ostrowski	1790 – 1869	Polish nobleman (szlachcic). Recognised for Napoleon's Russian Campaign (1812 – 1813).	TBA (1813)
Terence Otway	1914 – 2006	British Army officer. Known for his role as commander of the paratroop assault on the Merville Battery on D-Day.	TBA (2001)
Georges Ouégnin, directeur du protocole d'Etat ivoirien			TBA
William "Bill" Bruce Overstreet, Jr.		World War II P-51 "Mustang" Fighter pilot. 357th FG, 363rd FS, "Yoxford Boys"	Knight (8 December 2009)
Amos Oz	1939 – 2018	Israeli people writer, novelist, journalist, and intellectual.	TBA (1997)
Andranik Ozanian	1865 – 1927	Armenian military commander and statesman. Known fedayi and a key figure of the Armenian national liberation movement.	Officer (1919)
Seiji Ozawa	1935 – 2024	Japanese conductor. Promotion of French composers. Known for his advocacy of modern composers and for his work with the San Francisco Symphony.	Knight (1998)

== See also ==
- Legion of Honour
- List of Legion of Honour recipients by name
- List of foreign recipients of Legion of Honour by name
- List of foreign recipients of the Legion of Honour by country
- List of British recipients of the Legion of Honour for the Crimean War
- Legion of Honour Museum
- Ribbons of the French military and civil awards
- War Cross (France)
