= Crookenden =

Crookenden is a surname. Notable people with the surname include:

- Ian Crookenden (born 1943), New Zealand tennis player
- Napier Crookenden (1915–2002), British Army General
