= 9th (Eastern and Home Counties) Parachute Battalion =

- Cap badge of the Parachute Regiment
- Active: 1942–1947
- Country: United Kingdom
- Branch: British Army
- Type: Airborne forces
- Role: Parachute infantry
- Size: Battalion
- Part of: 3rd Parachute Brigade
- Nickname: Red Devils
- Mottos: Utrinque Paratus (Latin for "Ready for Anything")
- Engagements: Normandy landings Battle of the Bulge; River Rhine crossing

Commanders
- Notable commanders: Lieutenant Colonel James Hill; Lieutenant Colonel Martin Lindsay; Lieutenant Colonel Terence Otway; Lieutenant Colonel Napier Crookenden

Insignia
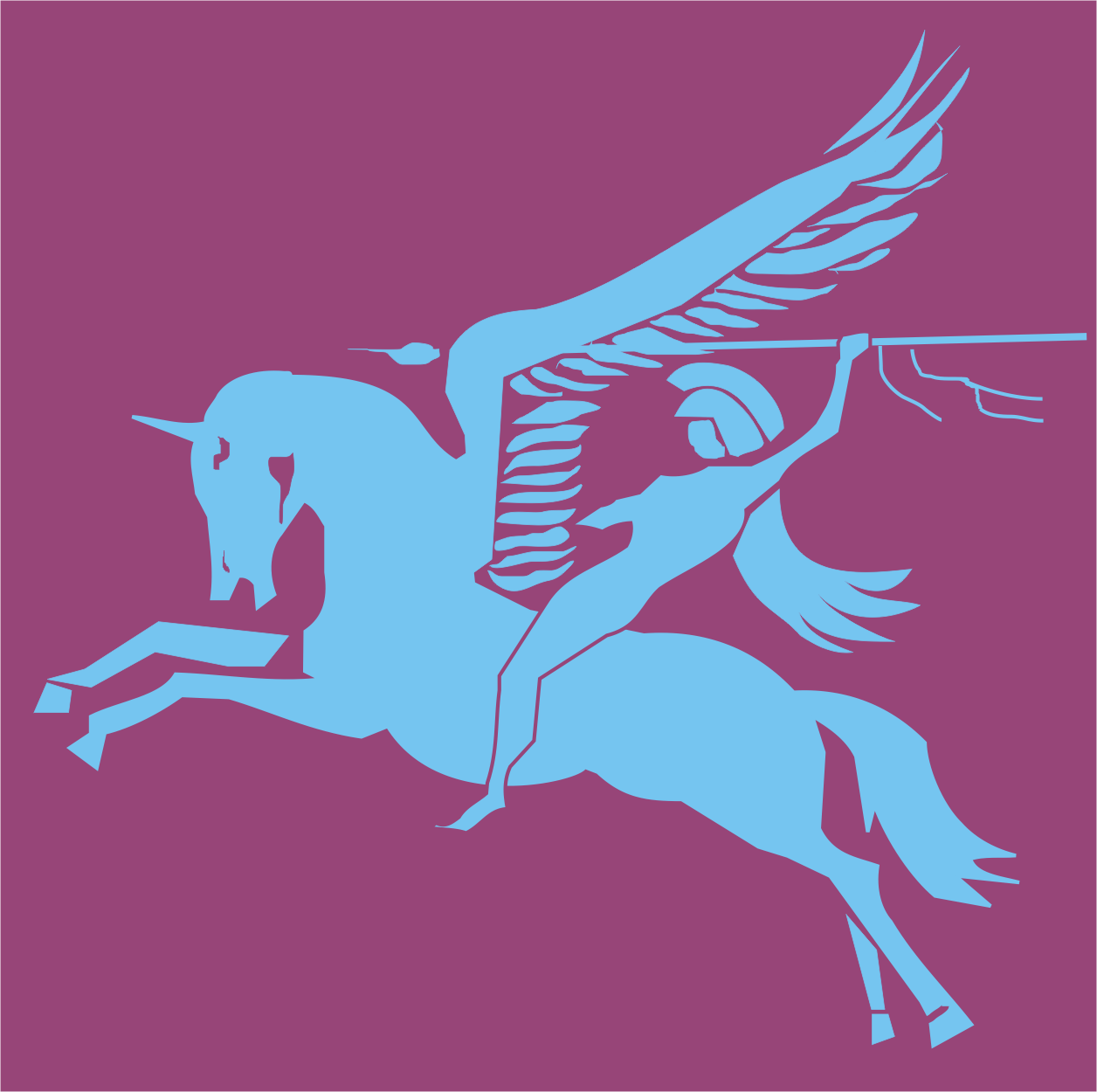
- The emblem of the Second World War British Airborne Forces, Bellerophon riding the flying horse Pegasus

The 9th (Eastern and Home Counties) Parachute Battalion was an airborne infantry battalion of the Parachute Regiment, raised by the British Army during the Second World War. The battalion was created in late 1942 by the conversion of the 10th Battalion, Essex Regiment to parachute duties. The battalion was assigned to the 3rd Parachute Brigade, alongside the 7th (later the 1st Canadian Parachute Battalion) and 8th Parachute battalions, then part of the 1st Airborne Division but was later transferred to the 6th Airborne Division.

The 9th Parachute Battalion took part in two major parachute landings in the Normandy invasion, and the River Rhine crossing in Germany. In Normandy they were responsible for the attack on the Merville Gun Battery, which, if not eliminated, could pose a danger to the Normandy landings.

After the war the battalion was sent to Palestine on internal security operations with the rest of the 6th Airborne Division in Palestine. Post-war army reductions in 1948 saw the battalion being amalgamated with the 8th (Midlands) Parachute Battalion (which had served with the 9th in 3 Para Brigade) as the 8th/9th Parachute Battalion, but by the end of the year the new battalion had been disbanded.

== Formation history ==
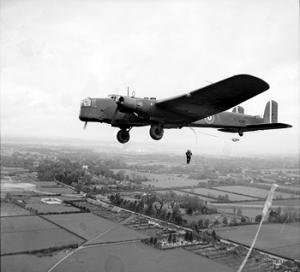
Parachute troops jumping from a Whitley bomber near Windsor England.

Based at Kiwi Barracks, Bulford Camp, Salisbury, the 9th (Eastern and Home Counties) Parachute Battalion was formed in November 1942, by the conversion of the 10th Battalion, Essex Regiment, a hostilities-only unit raised in late 1940, to parachute duties. (Note: In most conversions, the majority of the original battalion either did not wish to become paratroopers, failed medical or other tests. The spaces in the battalion were filled with volunteers from other units.) Upon formation, the battalion had an establishment of 556 men in three rifle companies. The companies were divided into a small headquarters and three platoons. The platoons had three Bren machine guns and three 2-inch mortars, one of each per section. The only heavy weapons in the battalion were a 3 inch mortar and a Vickers machine gun platoon.

The first commanding officer was Lieutenant Colonel James Hill. His first order on being appointed was to send the entire battalion on a forced march, at the end of which he announced that the battalion would "work a six and a half-day week" with Sunday afternoons off, until it was well-trained and fit. The battalion was assigned to the 3rd Parachute Brigade, which was initially attached to the 1st Airborne Division, but in April 1943 the 1st Airborne Division departed for the Mediterranean and the Allied invasion of Sicily without the 3rd Parachute Brigade. On 23 April 9th Parachute Battalion and the brigade were transferred to the newly formed 6th Airborne Division. At the same time Hill was promoted to take over as the brigade commander and he was replaced as commanding officer by Lieutenant Colonel Martin Lindsay who played a central role in the training of the battalion from April 1943 before being replaced by his second-in-command Lieutenant Colonel Terence Otway in April 1944. By 1944 a headquarters or support company, was added to the battalion. It comprised five platoons: motor transport, signals, mortar, machine-gun and anti-tank. With eight 3-inch (76 mm) mortars, four Vickers machine guns and ten PIAT anti-tank projectors.

All members of the battalion had to undergo a twelve-day parachute training course carried out at No. 1 Parachute Training School, RAF Ringway. Initial parachute jumps were from a converted barrage balloon and finished with five parachute jumps from an aircraft. (Note: Barrage balloons were used to speed up training jumps and meet the target of 5,000 trained parachutists.) Anyone failing to complete a descent was returned to his old unit. Those men who successfully completed the parachute course, were presented with their maroon beret and parachute wings.

Airborne soldiers were expected to fight against superior numbers of the enemy, armed with heavy weapons, including artillery and tanks. Hence, training was designed to encourage a spirit of self-discipline, self-reliance and aggressiveness. Emphasis was given to physical fitness, marksmanship and fieldcraft. A large part of the training regime consisted of assault courses and route marching. Military exercises included capturing and holding airborne bridgeheads, road or rail bridges and coastal fortifications. At the end of most exercises, the battalion would march back to their barracks. The ability to cover long distances at speed was expected: airborne platoons were required to cover a distance of 50 miles (80 km) in 24 hours, and battalions 32 miles (51 km). (Note: This ability was demonstrated in April 1945. When the 3rd Parachute Brigade advanced 15 miles (24 km) in twenty-four hours, which included eighteen hours of close-quarters fighting. In the same month the 5th Parachute Brigade marched 50 miles (80 km) in seventy-two hours, during which they also carried out two night time assaults.)

The 3rd Parachute Brigade was disbanded in October 1947, and the 8th and 9th Parachute battalion's were amalgamated as the 8th/9th Parachute Battalion. The new battalion was assigned to the 1st Parachute Brigade, however further post war reductions in the British Army saw this battalion disbanded in June 1948.

== Operational history ==
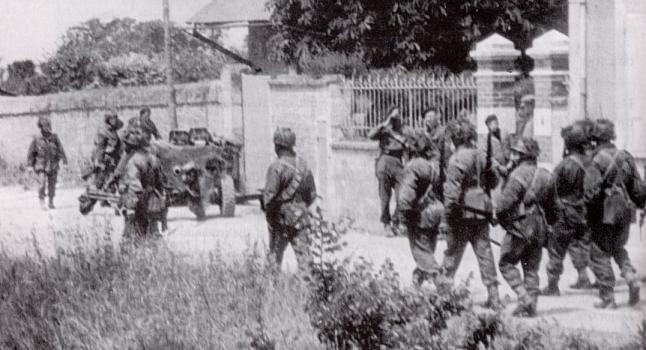
Men of the 9th Parachute Battalion marching through Amfreville.

=== France ===
The first combat action by the 9th Parachute Battalion, was in Operation Tonga, part of the Normandy landings. The battalion's primary objective was the Merville Gun Battery, which was in a position to threaten the British landings at Sword Beach. Although seriously understrength after a disastrous parachute drop, the battalion silenced the battery but was reduced in strength to 65 men. The battalion then attacked Le Plein, capturing the Chateau St Côme. Being too weak to attempt their last objective the battalions dug in around Le Plein. One of the battalion's casualties on 6 June was Paratroop dog Glen. The dog had been parachuted into Normandy with his handler, Emile "Jack" Corteil (aged 19), and both were killed during the day's fighting. They are buried together in the Ranville War Cemetery.

Over the following days the 9th Parachute Battalion fought off a number of attacks by the German 346th Infantry Division. On 8 June Lieutenant Colonel Otway was wounded by an artillery shell; eventually on 19 July 1944 he was evacuated, never returning to active service. For his command during the attack on the Merville battery he was awarded the Distinguished Service Order. Otway was replaced as commanding officer by the brigade major of the 6th Airlanding Brigade, Napier Crookenden who was promoted in the field to lieutenant colonel. On 12 June during the battle of Bréville the battalion was in danger of being overrun and had to call for urgent reinforcements, which came from a company of the 1st Canadian Parachute Battalion led by Brigadier James Hill, commander of the 3rd Para Brigade. They successfully counter-attacked and restored the line.

The 6th Airborne Division was assisted by reinforcements from the 1st and 4th Special Service Brigades and 153rd (Highland) Infantry Brigade. The southern edge of the Orne bridgehead was taken over by 51st (Highland) Infantry Division on 14 June allowing the 6th Airborne Division to consolidate its positions. The 9th Parachute Battalion remained in the front line carrying out patrols and sniping and fought off numerous attacks up to 16 August.

On 17 August the battalion advanced crossing the River Dives, between Cabourg and Troan. By 22 August they had reached the River Touques and the River Seine when the time the advance was stopped on 26 August. The battalion was then withdrawn back to England in September 1944.

=== Ardennes ===
The 6th Airborne Division was called to intervene in the German offensive in the Ardennes on 20 December 1944. Moved back to mainland Europe, on 26 December, they established a blocking position along the River Meuse. On 29 December they attacked leading German units and the 3rd Parachute Brigade was given responsibility for capturing Rochefort. The village was secured after meeting heavy resistance. After several months of heavy patrolling, in Belgium and the Netherlands, in February 1945, they were withdrawn to England once again.

=== Germany ===
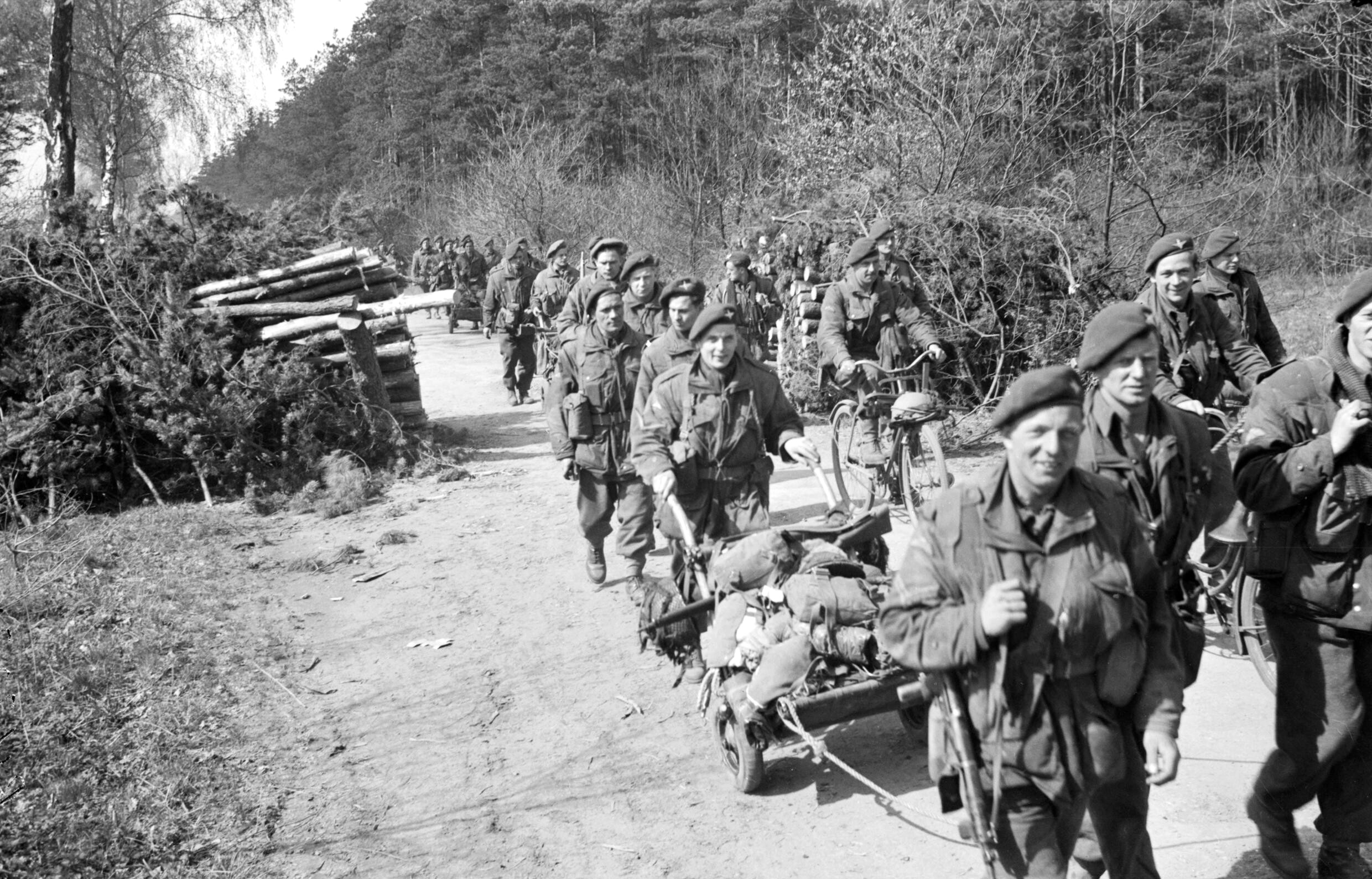
Men of the 9th Parachute Battalion in Germany.

In March 1945 the battalion took part in Operation Varsity the last airborne assault of the war, landing on the east bank of the river Rhine, by evening all of the battalion's first objectives had been taken. Heading towards its second objective, it come upon a strong German defensive position. The battalion, despite heavy fire, assaulted and captured the position, capturing 500 prisoners of war. The battalion was next ordered to capture a nearby village. Led by Lieutenant Colonel Crookenden, they crossed 500 yards (460 m) of open land and secured the village capturing 200 prisoners. The battalion continued the advance into Germany, reaching the Baltic Sea by the end of the war.

=== Palestine ===
In October 1945, the 6th Airborne Division was sent to the British Mandate of Palestine on internal security duties, the 3rd Parachute Brigade being based in the Lydda district, which included Tel Aviv. On 13 November the riots started in Tel Aviv, following the publication of white paper on Palestine. The violence spread and eventually the whole 3rd Parachute Brigade became involved and order was not established until 20 November. The battalion remained in Palestine until it was amalgamated with the 8th Parachute Battalion in October 1947.

== Notes ==
Footnotes

Citations
