= Battle of Merville Gun Battery =

Battle during D-Day landings

- Part of Operation Tonga
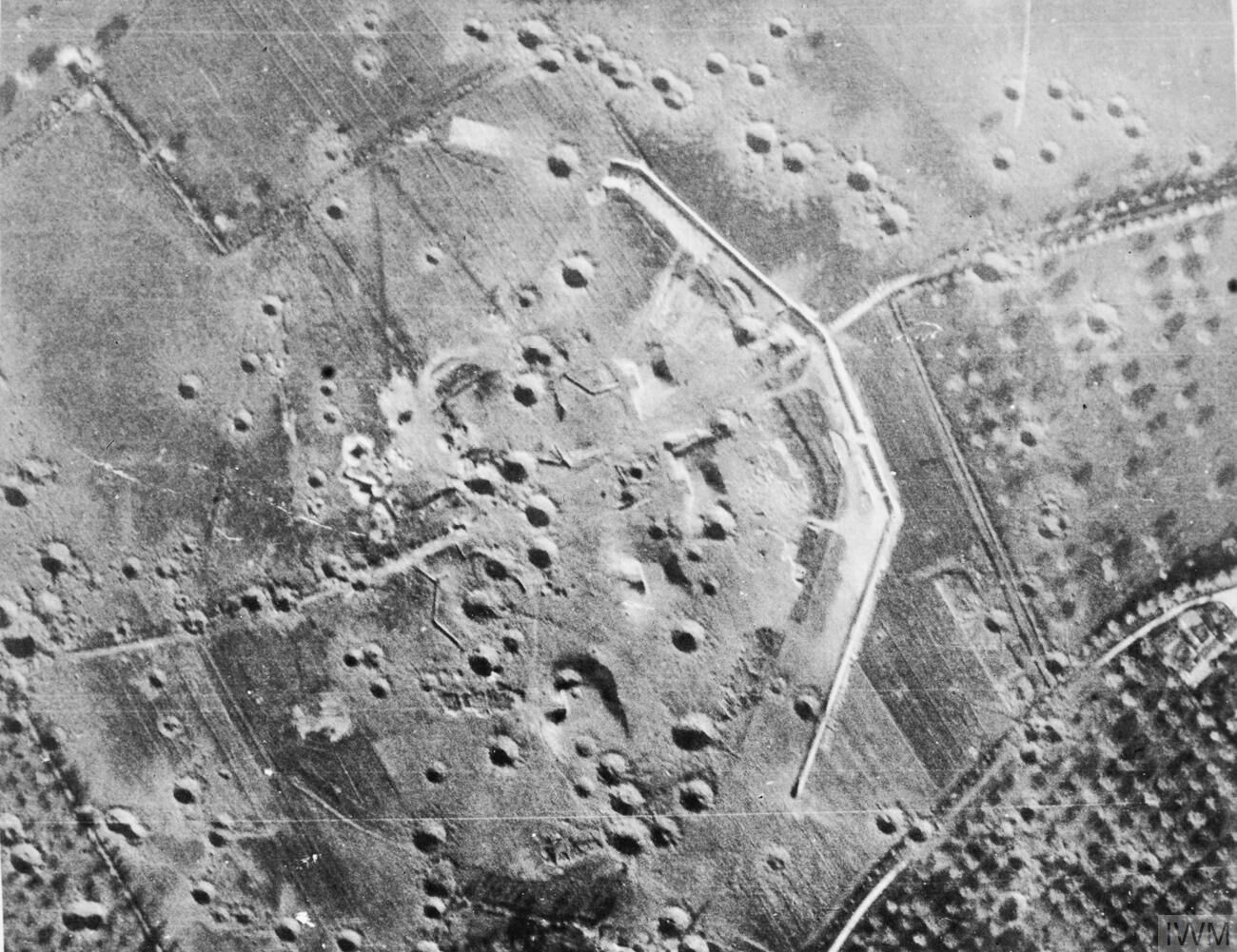
- Overhead view of the battery, showing the damage caused by a bombing raid in May 1944
Date	6–7 June 1944
Location	Merville, France 49°16′12″N 0°11′47″W
Result	6 June 1944: British victory 7 June 1944: German victory

Belligerents
United Kingdom	Germany

Commanders and leaders
(United Kingdom) Terence Otway (United Kingdom) Major John Pooley † (7 June 1944)	(Nazi Germany) Raimund Steiner

Units involved
9th Parachute Battalion (6 June 1944) 3 Commando (7 June 1944)	(Nazi Germany) 716th Infantry Division: Artillery Regiment 1716; 1st Battery

Strength
6 June 1944: 150 (assault force); 600 (in total) 7 June 1944: c. 150 men	130

Casualties and losses
6 June 1944: 75 (during the assault); 7 June 1944: heavy	22 killed 22 captured
- 6 June 1944: 450 men failed to arrive at the battalion assembly area following the parachute landing

The Battle of Merville Gun Battery was a series of British assaults beginning 6 June 1944, as part of Operation Tonga, part of the Normandy landings, during the Second World War. Allied intelligence believed the Merville Gun Battery was composed of heavy-calibre 150 mm (5.9 in) guns that could threaten the British landings at Sword Beach, only 8 miles (13 km) away.

The 9th Parachute Battalion, part of the 3rd Parachute Brigade attached to 6th Airborne Division, was given the objective of destroying the battery. However, when the battalion arrived over Normandy in the predawn of 6 June, their parachute descent was dispersed over a large area, so instead of over 600 men with heavy weapons or equipment, only 150 with neither arrived at the battalion assembly point. Regardless, they pressed home their attack against an estimated German force of 130 engineers and artillerymen. Reduced to 75 men, the British succeeded in capturing the battery, only to discover that the guns were World War I-era Czech M.14/19 100 mm field howitzers, which only had an effective range of some 8,400 m (9,200 yd), just over 5 miles. Still, using what explosives they had been able to recover, they attempted, with only partial success, to disable the guns.

The see-saw action saw the battery change hands several times. When the British paratroopers had withdrawn, two of the guns were put back into action by the Germans. Another assault by British Commandos failed to disable the guns and the battery remained under German control until 17 August, when the German Army started to withdraw from the area.

== Background ==
On 6 June 1944, the British 6th Airborne Division was given the task of securing the left flank of the Allied seaborne landings. One of their objectives was the destruction of the Merville Gun Battery. Allied planners had judged from the size of the concrete emplacements that their guns must be around 150 millimetres (5.9 in) in calibre, with an estimated range of about 8 miles (13 km). At this distance, they could threaten the 3rd British Infantry Division's landing area, codenamed Sword, to the west of Ouistreham, where D-day invasion troops were to begin to land after dawn.

=== British forces ===
The unit assigned to destroy the battery was the 9th Parachute Battalion, part of the 3rd Parachute Brigade, commanded by Lieutenant Colonel Terence Otway. The battalion's normal complement of 600 men (Note: Other sources give the number as 635 paratroopers and sappers.) was supported by a troop of sappers from 591st (Antrim) Parachute Squadron, Royal Engineers, eight Airspeed Horsa glider loads transporting Jeeps and trailers, and stores including explosives, an anti-tank gun and flamethrowers. Three of the gliders, transporting 50 volunteers, were to carry out a coup de main landing onto the position to coincide with the ground assault. In April 1944, the force was taken to Walbury Hill in Berkshire, where over seven days the Royal Engineers had built a full-scale replica of the battery, including obstacles and barbed wire fences. The following five days were spent holding briefings and getting acquainted with the layout of the battery. They carried out nine practice assaults, four of them at night. Due to the nature of the mission, the battalion was given additional medical support from No. 3 Section 224th (Parachute) Field Ambulance. (Note: A medical section was composed of: an officer (doctor) and a staff sergeant (nursing orderly); under their command were three nursing orderlies, a clerk, a dutyman and thirteen stretcher bearers. All members of No. 3 Section attached to the 9th Parachute Battalion became casualties in the battle.) Another unit that would be present during the attack but not directly involved was A Company of the 1st Canadian Parachute Battalion, tasked with providing covering fire for the 9th Battalion's approach to and withdrawal from the battery.

The predawn assault was planned to be completed and the battalion clear of the position by 05:00 AM, when the Royal Navy cruiser HMS Arethusa was set to open fire on the battery with naval gunfire.

=== Battery ===
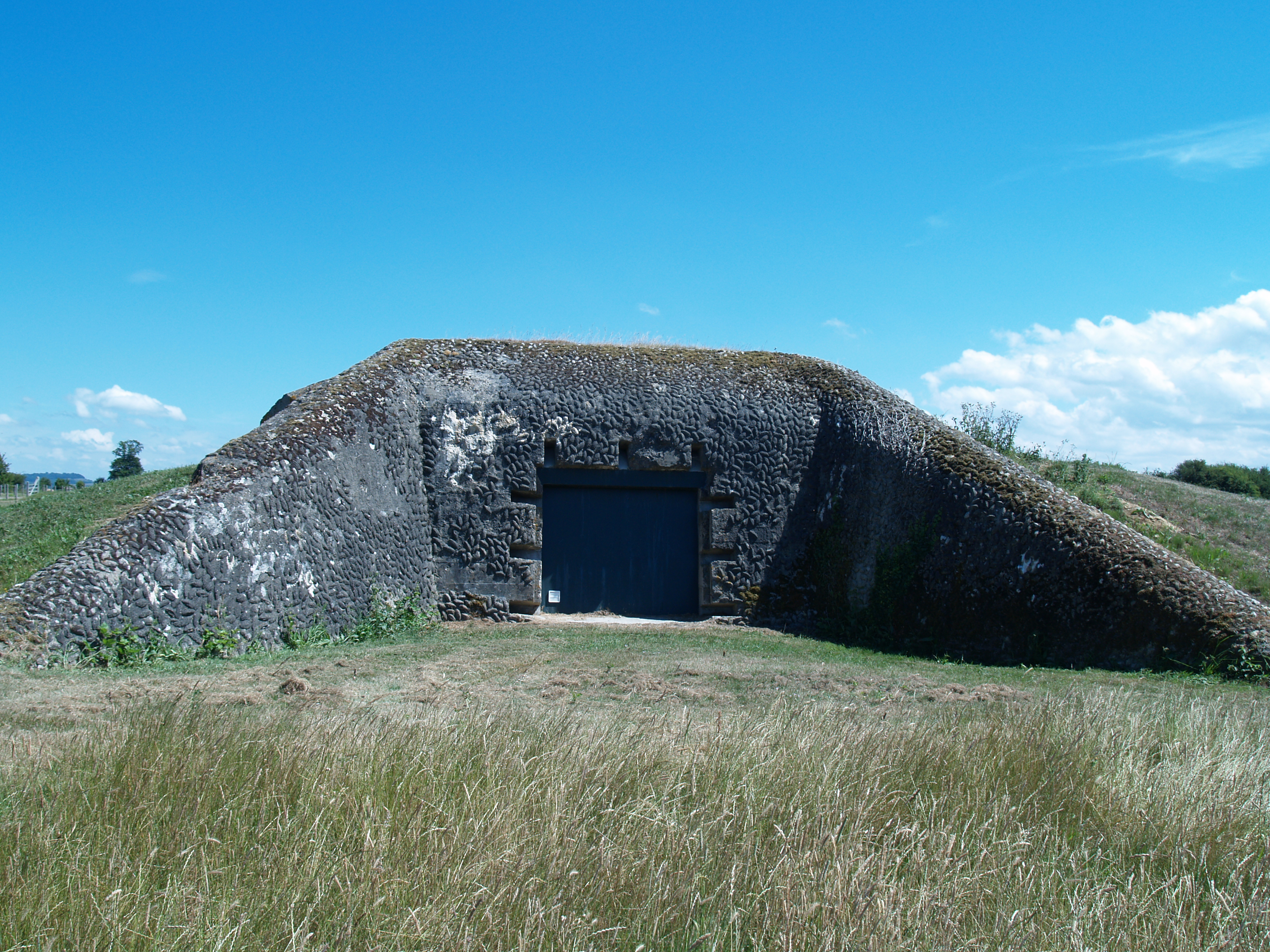
2010 photograph of one of the concrete gun casemates

The Merville Battery was composed of four 6-foot-thick (1.8 m) steel-reinforced concrete gun casemates facing the English Channel, built by the Todt Organisation. Each was designed to protect First World War-vintage Czech M.14/19 100 mm howitzers. Other buildings on the site included a command bunker, a building to accommodate the men, and ammunition magazines. During a visit on 6 March 1944, to inspect the defences, Field Marshal Erwin Rommel ordered the builders to work faster, and by May 1944, the last two casemates were completed.

The battery was defended by a 20 mm anti-aircraft gun and multiple machine guns arrayed in 15 gun positions, all enclosed in an area 700 by 500 yards (640 by 460 m) surrounded by two barbed wire obstacles 15 feet (4.6 m) deep by 5 feet (1.5 m) high, which also acted as the exterior border for a 100-yard-deep (91 m) minefield. Another obstacle was an anti-tank ditch covering any approach from the nearby coast. The original commander of the battery, Hauptmann Wolter, was killed during a Royal Air Force bombing raid on 19 May 1944. He was replaced by Oberleutnant Raimund Steiner, who commanded 50 engineers and 80 artillerymen from the 1st Battery, Artillery Regiment 1716, part of the 716th Static Infantry Division.

== Assault 6 June 1944 ==
Just after midnight on 6 June, the 9th Parachute Battalion's advance party landed with the brigade's pathfinders, and reached the battalion assembly area without any problems. While some men remained to mark out the company positions, the battalion's second in command, Major George Smith, and a reconnaissance party left to scout the battery. At the same time, Royal Air Force Lancaster bombers started their bombing run, which completely missed the battery to the south. The pathfinders in the meantime were ineffective, as those who had arrived at the correct drop zone found their Eureka beacons had been damaged when they landed, and the smoke and debris from the bombing obscured their marker lights from the pilots of the transport aircraft. The main body of the 9th Parachute Battalion and their gliders were to land from 01:00 at drop zone 'V', located between the battery and Varaville 4 km (2.5 mi) inland. However, the battalion was scattered, with a number of paratroopers landing a considerable distance from the designated drop zone. Lieutenant Colonel Otway landed with the rest of his "stick" 400 yards (370 m) away from the drop zone at a farmhouse being used as a command post by a German battalion; after a brief fire-fight, they helped other scattered paratroopers, and reached the drop zone at 01:30. By 02:50, only 150 men had arrived at the battalion's assembly point with 20 Bangalore torpedoes and a machine gun. The mortars, anti-tank gun, mine detectors, jeeps, sappers and field ambulance section were all missing.

Plan of the battery and assault

Aware of the time constraints, Otway decided he could wait no longer, and the reduced battalion headed for the battery and joined up with Major Smith's reconnaissance party just outside the village of Gonneville en Auge. The reconnaissance party had cut a way through the barbed wire, and marked four routes through the minefield. Otway divided his men into four assault groups, and settled down to await the arrival of the three gliders.

In England, one of the gliders diverted to RAF Odiham as its tow rope had snapped during bad weather. The other two gliders, unable to locate the battery, did not land where assigned. On their run in, both gliders were hit by anti-aircraft fire. One landed around 2 miles (3.2 km) away, the other at the edge of the minefield. The troops from this glider became involved in a fire fight with German troops heading to reinforce the battery garrison.

Otway launched the assault as soon as the first glider overshot the battery, ordering the explosives to be detonated to form two paths through the outer perimeter through which the paratroopers attacked. The defenders were alerted by the detonations, and opened fire, inflicting heavy casualties; only four attackers survived to reach Casemate Four, which they assaulted by firing into its apertures and throwing grenades into air vents. The other casemates were cleared of personnel with fragmentation and white phosphorus grenades, as the crews had neglected to lock the doors leading into the battery. During the bombing raid, the battery's guns had been moved inside the casemates and the steel doors left open for ventilation. During the battle, 22 Germans were killed and a similar number made prisoners of war. The rest of the garrison escaped undetected by hiding in underground bunkers.

Steiner was not present during the bombing, but at a command bunker in Franceville-Plage. After the raid, he set out for the battery, but was unable to gain entry due to the volume of fire from the British paratroopers. At the same time, a reconnaissance patrol from an army Flak unit with a half-track mounting a large anti-aircraft gun arrived. The crew had intended to seek cover at the position, but instead used the gun to engage the paratroopers.

With the battery in their hands, but no sappers or explosives, the British gathered together what plastic explosives they had been issued for use with their Gammon bombs to try to destroy the guns. By this time, Steiner had returned to Franceville-Plage, and directed his regiment's 2nd and 3rd Batteries to fire onto the Merville Battery.

== Subsequent actions ==
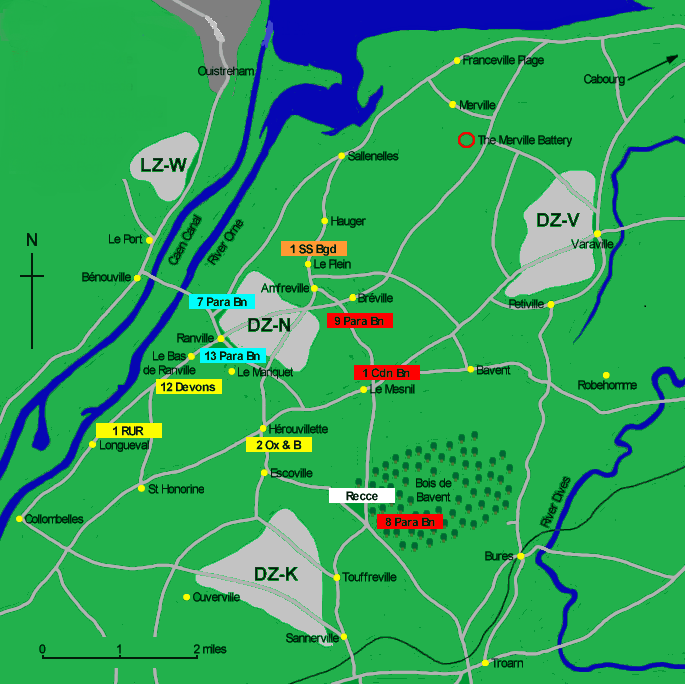
The 6th Airborne Division, positions June 1944

Following the assault, the battalion's survivors, just 75 men of the 150 who had set out, left the battery and headed for their secondary objective, the village of Le Plein. The battalion, being too weak, only managed to liberate around half of the village, and had to await the arrival of the 1st Commando Brigade later in the day to complete its capture.

Meanwhile No. 3 Commando, of the 1st Special Service Brigade, which had landed at Sword Beach that morning, had advanced quickly to the bridge spanning the River Orne, where they had linked up with the airborne and glider troops who had seized the bridge in the early hours of the morning. Crossing the bridge, which was still under fire, they had made contact with the paratroop units to the east of the river, and 3 Troop was/had been ordered to capture Amfreville and Le Plein, to link up with 9th Para. This they did later in the day.

Also during 6 June the Germans were able to re-establish themselves at the Merville battery and bring two of the guns there back into action. This led to a need to assault the position once more.

== Assault 7 June 1944 ==
3 Commando having assisted the 9th Parachute Battalion in capturing the heights around Le Plein was now ordered to perform its own assault on the battery.

On 7 June, Nos. 4 and 5 Troops of 3 Commando under command of Major John Pooley MC, carried out an attack on Merville battery, whose guns had been repaired and were again firing toward and several miles short of the landing beaches. Since the first assault the battery had been reoccupied and it was now heavily defended by mortars and landmines. Approaching from Le Plein to the south, No. 4 Troop moved across the open ground before taking up position behind the hedgerows 270 metres (300 yd) from the battery and from there laid down covering fire for No. 5 Troop which approached from the east with fixed bayonets.

After a stubborn German defence, in which a number of Commandos, including Major Pooley, were killed, the Commandos took the battery, however, shortly afterwards they were counterattacked by a German force supported by half-tracks and self-propelled artillery. Casualties during this German counter-attack were high and the surviving Commandos withdrew back to Le Plein, having been unsuccessful in disabling the guns and leaving the Germans in possession of the battery once more.

== Aftermath ==
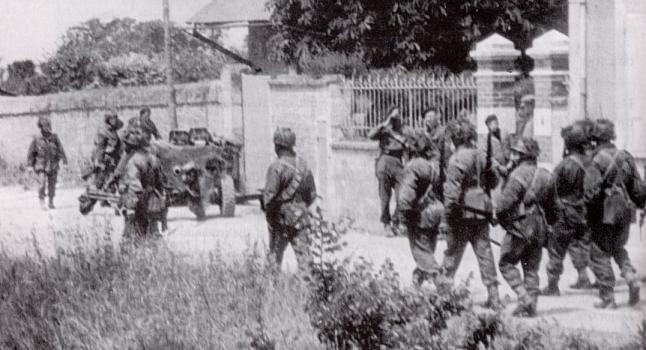
Men of the 9th Parachute Battalion marching through Amfreville in Calvados later in June

After the Germans reoccupied the battery position, Steiner was unable to see Sword from his command bunker, so even though he was able to get two of his guns back in action, he was unable to direct accurate fire several miles short of the landings. However, observers with the 736th Infantry Regiment, holding out at La Brèche, were able to direct his guns in that direction until that position was neutralised.

The British never succeeded in completely destroying the battery, and it remained under German control until 17 August, when the German Army started to withdraw from France.

== Notes ==
Footnotes

Citations
