= Terence Otway =

British Army officer (1914–2006)

Terence Brandram Hastings Otway
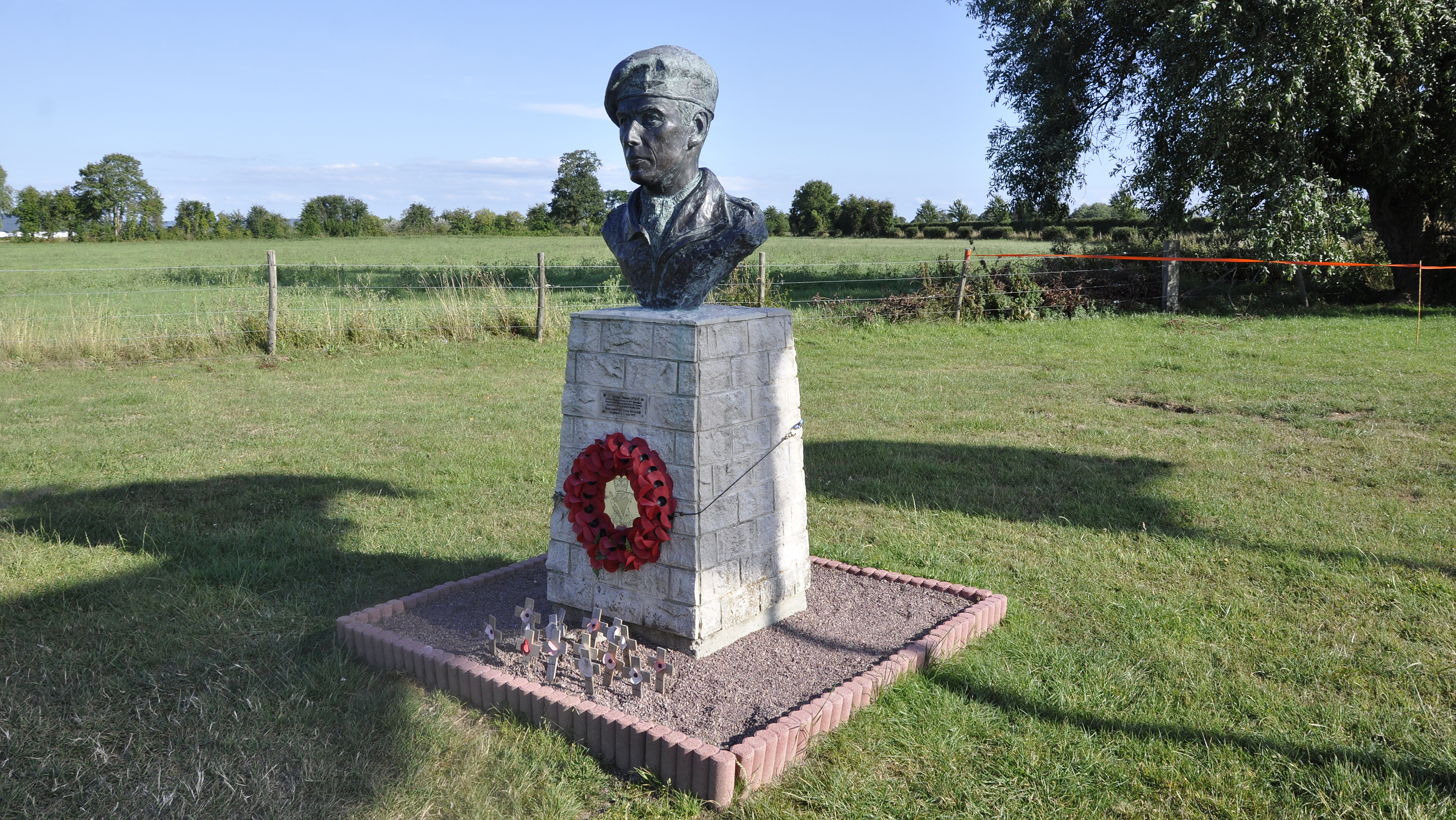
- Bust of Lt Col Otway DSO at Merville
- Born: 15 June 1914; Cairo, Egypt
- Died: 23 July 2006 (aged 92)
- Relatives: James Hastings Otway (Father); Corran Purdon (Cousin)
- Military career
- Allegiance: United Kingdom
- Branch: British Army
- Service years: 1933−1948
- Rank: Lieutenant Colonel
- Service number: 63633
- Unit: Royal Ulster Rifles
- Commands: 9th Parachute Battalion; 15th Parachute Battalion
- Conflicts: Second World War: Operation Tonga
- Awards: Distinguished Service Order; Legion d’Honneur (France)

Lieutenant Colonel Terence Brandram Hastings Otway DSO, (15 June 1914 – 23 July 2006) was an officer in the British Army, best known for his role as commander of the paratroop assault on the Merville Battery on D-Day.

== Early life ==
Otway was born in Cairo, Egypt, on 15 June 1914 at the American Hospital, he returned with the family to England in 1915, where he stayed while his father served in France. From December 1918 to autumn 1921, he lived in Rushbrooke, County Cork, Ireland. The family returned to England, where Terence attended the local Council school at Thame, Buckinghamshire, followed by Watford Grammar School. In the last 6 months of 1923, he became severely ill with whooping cough. As a result, on medical advice he was sent to Dover College, where the sea air would help lungs that were in a poor state. He was at the Junior school until 1928 and the senior school until 1932.

== Military career ==
In January 1933, Otway entered the Royal Military College, Sandhurst reaching the rank of cadet sergeant and passing out 18th of 200. Although this gave him eligibility to join the Indian Army, he chose the British and, in August 1934, was commissioned into the 2nd Battalion of the Royal Ulster Rifles, based at Gravesend.

In the summer of 1935, Otway required a serious middle ear operation at The Royal Naval Hospital, Chatham. During convalescence his pub-crawling companion was the Crown Prince of Spain, who was in the next room.

In autumn 1935, Otway was posted to 1st Battalion, based in Hong Kong. He travelled by P&O liner to take up his post as Intelligence Officer. In May 1937, he was posted to Hong Kong HQ Cipher staff. In August 1937 he was promoted to lieutenant and rejoined the battalion who were posted to Shanghai as part of the international force sent to protect the settlement from the Japanese who had invaded China. The battalion suffered four months of constant bombing, shelling and machine-gun fire from the Japanese, losing twenty killed. In December 1937, the battalion was posted to Rawalpindi, then part of India. On return from six weeks leave the battalion was posted to Razani, North West Frontier. Otway was appointed signals officer.

=== Early wartime service ===
In August 1939, during three months leave, Otway married Stella Whitehead, daughter of Basil Whitehead of Bovey Tracey, Devon, a retired Colonial Police Officer, who had been Chief of Police in Penang, Malaya. Otway and Stella returned to Rawalpindi, but Stella flew home in April 1940, while the battalion returned by sea to Oxford for conversion to mechanised infantry (from the camels, mules and horses they had been using in India.)

In December 1940, Otway was promoted to major. He went to Staff College in June 1941, passing out 4th of 200 in December 1941. During 1942 he served as a Staff Officer in London, responsible for briefings and briefing papers for the War Cabinet. In July 1943 he returned to the Royal Ulster Rifles as a company commander. The battalion was part of the 6th Airborne Division.

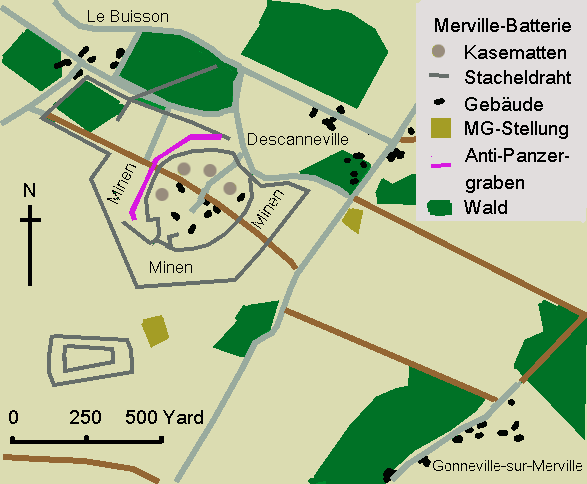

=== Normandy ===
In August 1943, Otway transferred to the Parachute Regiment to become Second-in-Command of the 9th (Eastern and Home Counties) Parachute Battalion. In March 1944, he was promoted to lieutenant colonel and took over as Commanding Officer (CO).

The Normandy landings - the start of the liberation of Europe - took place in June 1944. The 9th were dropped in the night before to secure vital objectives, particularly to neutralise the Merville Gun Battery.

In spite of severe problems in the landing, his battalion took the Merville Battery. Otway started with about 750 men, few of whom had seen action before; of the 150 who took part in the attack, 65 had been either killed or wounded by the end of the action, which saved a great many Allied lives.

His numerically weak and all but exhausted battalion then pushed into Le Plein, where they encountered stiffening resistance and, despite their depleted numbers, took Château St Come on the ridge, and succeeded in beating off two enemy attacks, each of several hours duration, by a regiment of 21st Panzer Division.

Two days later during a routine tour of his positions, a stray shell landed close to Otway. He was diagnosed with severe concussion and on 19 July 1944 was subsequently evacuated to hospital in Cardiff, then graded unfit for a return to active service, and was posted as a Staff Officer to the War Office.

Otway was awarded the Distinguished Service Order (DSO) in October 1944 for his outstanding leadership in the actions at Merville and Le Plein. The citation for his DSO stated that his utter disregard for personal danger had been an inspiration to all his men.

=== Service in Asia ===
He was regraded category 'A' in May 1945 and posted as Commanding Officer of the 1st Battalion King's Regiment (Liverpool) (Wingate's Burma Force) in Rawalpindi with instructions to turn them into the 15th (King's) Parachute Battalion, part of 77th Indian Parachute Brigade attached to the 2nd Indian Airborne Division. In September 1945, Otway was appointed GSO1 at Division which was posted to Karachi, where in December Stella and his son, Michael joined him. After one year he was posted to the War Office as a GSO1 and the family returned home. His task was to write the official history of "Airborne Forces". Originally restricted, it finally became available to the public in 1990 as Army Airborne Forces in the Second World War to mark their 50th anniversary.

=== Post-war career ===
Disillusioned with the post-war Army, Otway resigned his commission in January 1948. He joined the Colonial Development Corporation as Assistant General Manager, The Gambia, transferring a year later as a General Manager to Nyasaland. In June 1949 he was invalided back to the UK and banned from further service in the East.

Between 1949 and 1965 Otway worked in the area of sales and management, starting by selling life insurance as a learning experience and culminating as General Manager for Kemsley Newspapers (later Thomson Newspapers) and then as managing director of the Empire News, a Sunday paper with a circulation of 5.5 million. After the Thomson take-over Otway resigned over financing requirements of the papers.

He started an import/export business specialising in toys and gifts with a shop in Knightsbridge. The business prospered until, in 1965, a change in Value Added Tax law effectively killed it. After a brief period with Outward Bound, Otway joined Scotia Investments Ltd., a public company in the Leisure field, as Administrative Controller in 1966. In 1975, he sensed an impending scandal over misuse of funds and resigned, joining the London Chamber of Commerce with responsibility for membership. He retired in 1979, but retained various connections with business in non-executive directorships.

=== Retirement ===
During retirement, he continued to remain active particularly in areas relating to the welfare of soldiers and their widows, as well as historical aspects of The Parachute Regiment, especially in respect of monuments in Normandy, France. He became known as 'Colonel X' when fighting for the rights of serviceman's' widows and their pensions. He was instrumental in persuading the Government to change their miserly attitude. In 1991, aged 76, he still had the energy to take up the cases of three guardsmen seriously injured during a training exercise in Canada, publicising the issue and successfully putting pressure on the Government for adequate compensation for the men.

In 1995, his health and energy undiminished, he was still pruning branches, perched on a ladder, from a tree in the garden of his home in Tadworth, Surrey, to some consternation of his third wife Jeannie. He was also involved on the fringes in the case for the release of Lee Clegg, a paratrooper imprisoned for murder after a shooting in Northern Ireland at the time of the troubles.

== Honours and awards ==
When he met the German commander of the battery in 1993 he admitted that he did not have the guts to refuse the proffered hand, but said afterwards that he could not forget his men, shot by the Germans as they hung helpless in trees. He shooed away picknickers from the battery, which is now a memorial and museum, declaring: "I don't like people eating and drinking where my men died."

The citizens of Merville-Franceville-Plage in Normandy, France, decided to honour Otway by the placing of a bust depicting him at the age of 29 at the time of D-Day and the assault on the battery. This was unveiled in the grounds of the Merville Battery Museum on 7 June 1997 by himself, Raymond Triboulet, a leader of the French Resistance during the war, and Olivier Paz, the Mayor. The bust was sculpted by Vivienne Mallock who had also created busts of John Howard, Bernard Law Montgomery and Richard Nelson Gale. There was a large family gathering to witness the ceremony and twenty-one people sat down to dinner that night at the Moulin du Pre, a local restaurant, converted from a farmhouse, coincidentally the same farmhouse against which Otway landed on the night before D-Day.

In 2001, he was awarded the Légion d'Honneur, and more recently had a new road near the battery named after him (Rue Colonel Otway).

In 2007 his medals and beret were donated to the Merville Battery Museum by his wife, Jean. Visitors can now see the DSO and Légion d'honneur, along with a description of the battle by Otway taken from a BBC documentary.

== Film and media ==
For the 50th anniversary, Mark Fielder produced a documentary called 'D-Day: Turning the Tide' in which Charles Wheeler, a D-Day landings veteran, visited the area of the Merville Battery and interviewed some of the protagonists, including Lt. Col. Terence Otway, and Raimund Steiner - the commander of the battery at the time of the assault. The documentary also features Maj John Howard who led the glider-borne attack on Pegasus Bridge.

In 2004, for the D-Day 60th Anniversary programming, the BBC commissioned a drama-documentary entitled D-Day 6 June 1944 which included interviews with members of both the Allied and German armed forces, along with dramatisations of some of the key scenes. Otway described the battle, and his character was played by Philip Rham. The film was later released on DVD.

== Notes ==
Citations
