= Napier Crookenden =

British Army general (1915–2002)

Lieutenant-General Sir Napier Crookenden KCB DSO OBE DL
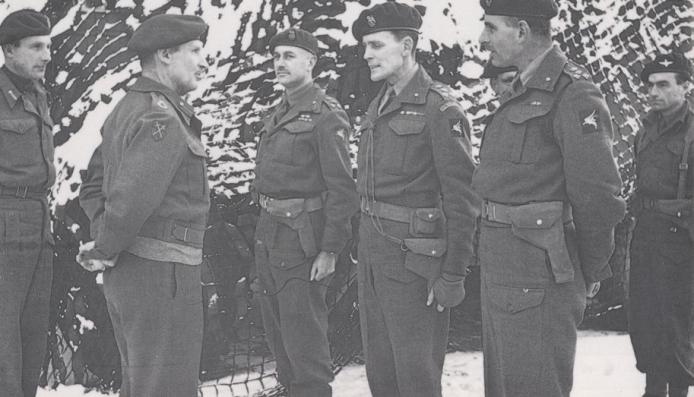
- Lt. Col. Napier Crookenden (extreme right) with Gen Sir Bernard Montgomery
- Born: 31 August 1915; Chester, Cheshire, England
- Died: 31 October 2002 (aged 87)
- Military career
- Allegiance: United Kingdom
- Branch: British Army
- Service years: 1935−1972
- Rank: Lieutenant-General
- Service number: 66121
- Unit: Cheshire Regiment
- Commands: 9th (Eastern and Home Counties) Parachute Battalion; 16th Parachute Brigade; Royal Military College of Science; Western Command
- Conflicts: Second World War; Malayan Emergency
- Awards: Knight Commander of the Order of the Bath; Distinguished Service Order; Officer of the Order of the British Empire

Lieutenant-General Sir Napier Crookenden KCB DSO OBE DL (31 August 1915 − 31 October 2002) was a British Army officer who reached high office in the 1960s.

== Military career ==
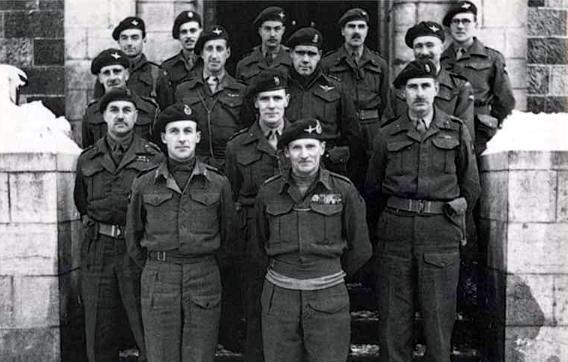
Field Marshal Montgomery and senior officers of the 6th Airborne Division in the Ardennes, January 1945. Stood on the extreme left in the back row is Lieutenant Colonel Napier Crookenden.

Educated at Wellington College and the Royal Military College, Sandhurst, Crookenden was commissioned into the Cheshire Regiment in August 1935.

He served in the Second World War as a brigade major in the 6th Airlanding Brigade in 1943 planning and implementing glider assaults to secure bridges over the River Orne on the day of the Normandy landings. He served as commanding officer of 9th (Eastern and Home Counties) Parachute Battalion between 1944 and 1946 leading his regiment in the Battle of the Bulge and then the crossing of the River Rhine.

He was Director of Operations during the Malayan Emergency between 1952 and 1954 and served as Commander of 16th Parachute Brigade from 1960 to 1961. He went to the Imperial Defence College in 1962. He was appointed Director of Land/Air Warfare at the Ministry of Defence in 1964 and then Commandant at the Royal Military College of Science in Shrivenham in 1967. He became the last General Officer Commanding-in-Chief of Western Command in 1969 and retired in 1972.

== Retirement ==
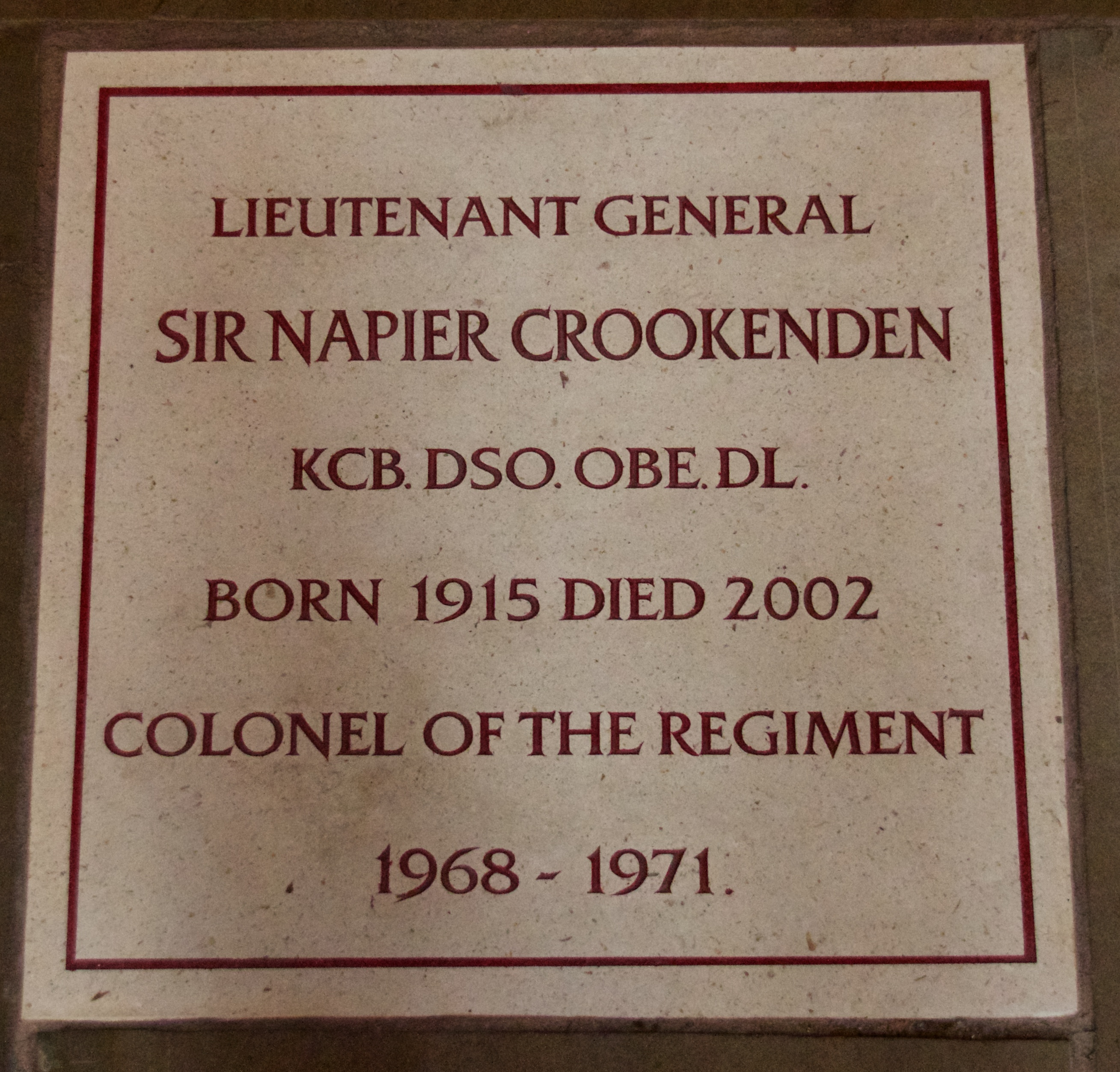
Memorial to Napier Crookenden in Chester Cathedral

In retirement he became a Deputy Lieutenant for Kent. He was also a lecturer on military history on the P&O steamship Uganda.

== Family ==
In 1948 he married Patricia Nassau, daughter of Hugh Kindersley, 2nd Baron Kindersley, and they went on to have two sons and two daughters.

== Notable works ==
- Crookenden, Napier (1978). Airborne at War. Ian Allan. ISBN 978-0-7110-0771-0.
- Crookenden, Napier (1980). Battle of the Bulge 1944. Scribner. ISBN 978-0-684-16614-8.
- Crookenden, Napier (1976). Dropzone Normandy. The Story Of The American And British Airborne Assault On D Day 1944. Ian Allan. ISBN 978-0-7110-0660-7.

== Bibliography ==
- Dover, Major Victor (1981). The Sky Generals. Cassell. ISBN 0-304-30480-8.
- Harclerode, Peter (2005). Wings Of War — Airborne Warfare 1918–1945. Weidenfeld & Nicolson. ISBN 0-304-36730-3.
- Otway, Lieutenant-Colonel T.B.H. (1990). The Second World War 1939–1945 Army — Airborne Forces. Imperial War Museum. ISBN 0-901627-57-7.
- Saunders, Hilary St. George (1972). The Red Beret — The Story Of The Parachute Regiment 1940–1945. White Lion Publishers Ltd. ISBN 0-85617-823-3.
- Thompson, Major-General Julian (1990). Ready for Anything: The Parachute Regiment at War. Fontana. ISBN 0-00-637505-7.
- Tugwell, Maurice (1971). Airborne To Battle — A History Of Airborne Warfare 1918–1971. William Kimber & Co Ltd. ISBN 0-7183-0262-1.

Military offices
Preceded by Edward Bates	Commandant of the Royal Military College of Science; 1967–1969	Succeeded by Frank King
Preceded by Sir Antony Read	GOC-in-C Western Command; 1969−1972	Succeeded by Post disbanded
