= Merville Gun Battery =

Coastal fortification in Normandy, France

Coordinates: 49°16′10″N 0°11′52″W

- Part of Atlantic Wall
- Normandy, France
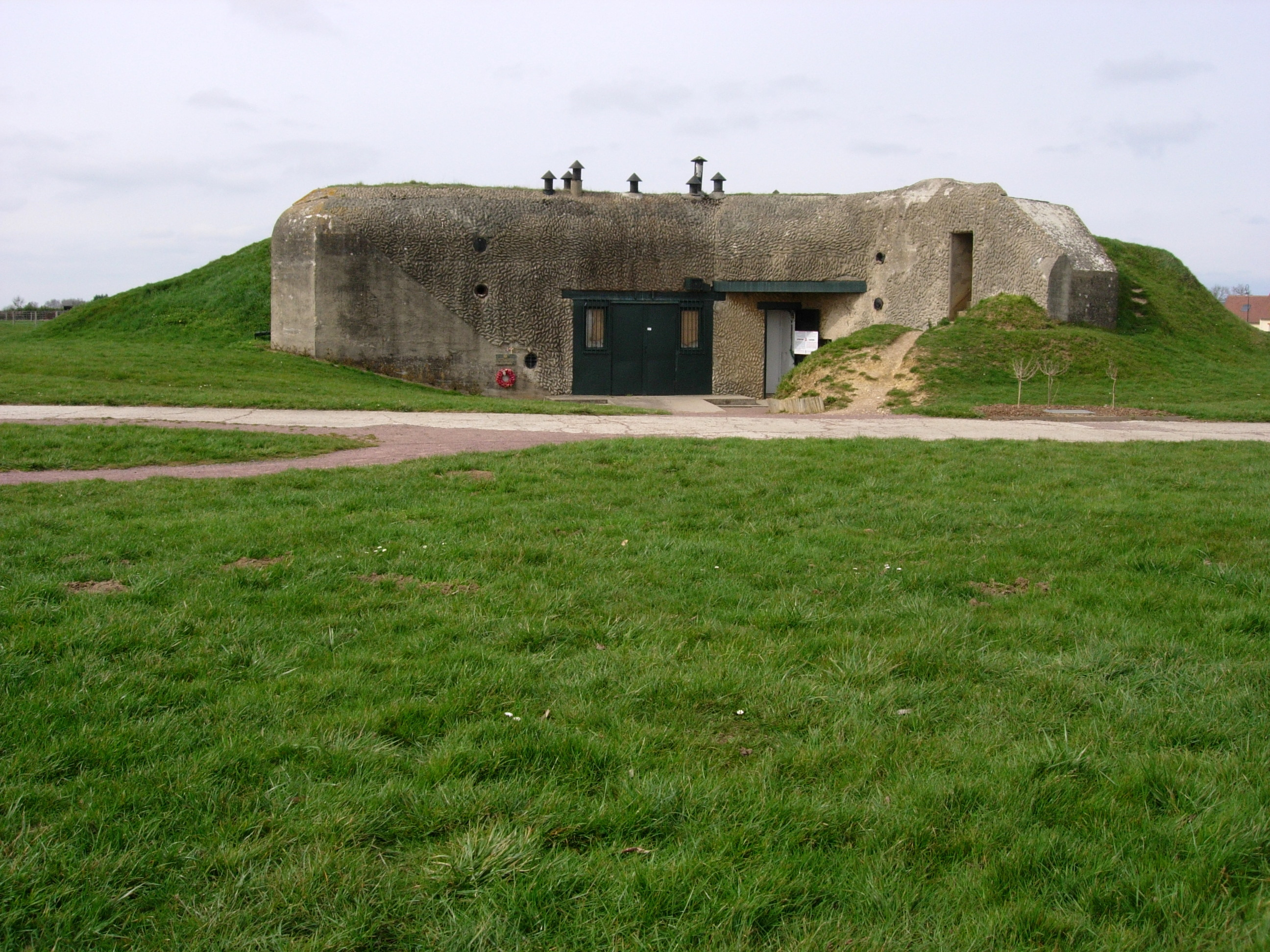
- Largest casemate of the Merville Battery today

Site information
- Type: Artillery battery
- Owner: Nazi Germany; 1942–44; France; 1944–present
- Open to the public: Yes
- Condition: Several casemates and trench system

Site history
- Built: World War II
- Built by: Organisation Todt
- In use: 1942-1944
- Materials: Concrete, steel, barbed wire
- Battles/wars: Normandy landings, Operation Tonga

Garrison information
- Garrison: Wehrmacht

The Merville Gun Battery is a decommissioned coastal fortification in Normandy, France, which was built as part of the Germans' Atlantic Wall to defend continental Europe from Allied invasion. It was a particularly heavily fortified position and one of the first places to be attacked by Allied forces during the Normandy Landings commonly known as D-Day. A British force under the command of Lieutenant Colonel Terence Otway succeeded in capturing this position, suffering heavy casualties.

== Defences ==
The Merville Battery is composed of four 6-foot-thick (1.8 m) steel-reinforced concrete gun casemates, built by the Todt Organisation. Each was designed to protect First World War-vintage Czech-made leFH 14/19(t) 100 mm (3.93-inch) mountain howitzers with a range of 8,400 m.

Other buildings on the site include a command bunker, a building to accommodate the men, and ammunition magazines. During a visit on 6 March 1944, to inspect the defences, Field Marshal Erwin Rommel ordered the builders to work faster, and by May 1944, the last two casemates were completed.

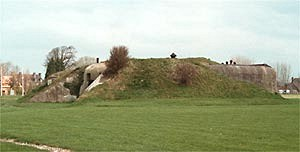
Side view of another casemate

The battery was defended by a 20 mm anti-aircraft gun and multiple machine guns in fifteen gun positions, all enclosed in an area 700 by 500 yards (640 by 460 m) surrounded by two barbed wire obstacles 15 feet (4.6 m) deep by 5 feet (1.5 m) high, which also acted as the exterior border for a 100-yard-deep (91 m) minefield. Another obstacle was an anti-tank ditch covering any approach from the nearby coast.
