= Whitby (surname) =

Whitby is a surname, and may refer to:

- Alfred Knight Whitby (c. 1844–1898), lawyer in Adelaide, South Australia
- Audrey Whitby (born 1996), American actress
- Beatrice Whitby (1855–1931), English novelist
- Ben Whitby (born 1977), English athlete
- Bill Whitby (1943–2016), American baseball pitcher
- Blay Whitby, British philosopher and technology ethicist
- Conrad Whitby (born 1984), Zimbabwean footballer
- Daniel Whitby (1638–1726), English theologian
- Edward Whitby (c.1578–1639) was an English lawyer and politician
- Elizabeth Whitby (c. 1803–1888), school founder in South Australia
- Francis John Whitby (c. 1840–1909), station manager for J. H. Angas in South Australia
- George Roland Whitby (1878–1966), British tea planter, businessman and member of parliament
- George S. Whitby (1887–1972), head of the University of Akron rubber laboratory
- Gordon Whitby (1926–2000), British physician and biochemist
- Greg Whitby (born 1952), Australian educator
- Henry Whitby (fl.1800), British Royal Navy captain
- H. A. Morton Whitby (1898–1969), British surgeon, urologist and cancer researcher
- Hugh Whitby (1864–1934), English cricketer and educator
- Janice Whitby (born 1950), American film and television actress
- John Whitby, British politician
- Joseph James Whitby (1838–1875), lawyer in Adelaide, South Australia
- Joy Whitby (born 1930), English television producer and executive
- Lionel Whitby (1895–1956), British haematologist, British Army officer and academic
- Mark Whitby (born 1950), British engineer and canoeist
- Mary Whitby, British philologist
- Mary Anne Whitby (1783–1850), English landowner, writer and artist
- Michael Whitby (born 1952), British ancient historian
- Mike Whitby (born 1948), English local politician
- Natalie Whitby, Australian judge
- Oliver Whitby (c.1602–1679), English Anglican priest
- Reece Whitby (born 1964), Australian politician
- Robert Whitby (1928–2003), English cricketer
- Susan Whitby, stage name Lora Logic (born c.1960) (redirect from Susan Whitby), British saxophonist, singer and songwriter
- Thomas Whitby (1813–1881), English cricketer
- Tim Whitby (fl. since 1992), British television writer and director
- Tony Whitby (1929–1975), British BBC Radio executive
- William Whitby (died 1655), Virginia colonial politician
- William Whitby (mariner) (1838–1922), New Zealand master mariner and shipowner
