= Beatrice Whitby =

English author

Beatrice Jeanie Whitby (1855, Ottery Saint Mary, Devon, UK – 20 January 1931) was an English author of novels and short stories.

== Biography ==
Beatrice Whitby's father was a physician, Dr. Charles Whitby. She was the middle daughter of Dr. Whitby's three daughters and had five brothers. Around 1880 the family moved to Leamington Spa in Warwickshire. The oldest son in the family was killed, after an illustrious military career, in the Second Anglo–Afghan War. Another of Dr. Whitby's sons, Hugh Whitby, was a famous cricketer. On 18 November 1894 she married a physician, Dr. Philip Hicks (1867–1922). For many years the couple lived at 11 Clarendon Square in Leamington Spa. They had a daughter, Beatrice Mary (born in 1899), and a son, Philip Hugh Whitby, nicknamed "Pip", who became a famous Brigadier in WW II.

From 1889 to 1911 Beatrice Whitby published about a dozen novels.

... Beatrice also published short stories in weekly instalments in the Leamington Courier. She was so well known locally that the newspaper advertised the sale of her portrait by Edwin Long R.A., exhibited at Notcutt’s Gallery in Bath Street in 1892. In a lecture in Leamington four years after her death, Dr Barry of the Historical Association ranked Beatrice alongside other “Leamington Ladies of Literary Fame”, – Miss Mary Dormer Harris, Miss Browne, and Miss Beatrice Harraden, sister of the composer Ethel.

Her husband died at age 55. Upon her death, her body was interred at his side in Milverton Cemetery.

== Selected publications ==
- The Awakening of Mary Fenwick: A Novel. 1889. 1892 edition.
- Part of the Property. 1890.
- One Reason Why. 1891.
- A Matter of Skill: A Novel. 1891.
- The Lake of Lucerne, and Other Stories. 1891.
- In the Suntime of her Youth. 1893.
- Mary Fenwick's Daughter. 1893.
- A Matter of Skill, and Other Stories. 1895.
- Sunset. 1897. Whitby, Beatrice (1898). 1898 edition.
- Bequeathed: A Novel. 1900.
- Flower and Thorn. 1901. 1902 edition.
- The Whirligig of Time. 1906.
- The Result of an Accident. 1908.
- Rosamund. 1911.
