= Thomas Haddon =

British Army officer (1913–1993)

- Born: 19 February 1913; Farnham, Surrey, England
- Died: 12 April 1993 (aged 80); Surrey, England
- Military career
- Allegiance: United Kingdom
- Branch: British Army
- Service years: 1933–1968
- Rank: Brigadier
- Nickname: "Tommy"
- Service number: 58141
- Unit: Border Regiment
- Commands: 1st Battalion, Border Regiment; Singapore Military Forces
- Conflicts: World War II; Palestine Emergency
- Awards: Commander of the Order of the British Empire

Brigadier Thomas Haddon CBE (19 February 1913 – 12 April 1993) was a British Army officer who served with the airborne forces during the Second World War, most notably during Operation Market Garden in September 1944. Following the war he raised the Singapore Military Forces and served as Chief of Staff of Hong Kong Land Forces.

== Early life and military career ==
The son of Major J. T. Haddon of the Cameronians (Scottish Rifles), Thomas Haddon was born in Farnham, Surrey, England, on 19 February 1913. He was educated at Hamilton Academy, described by the Cambridge University Press as "one of the finest schools in Scotland", and then at the Royal Military College, Sandhurst. He passed out from Sandhurst where he was commissioned as a second lieutenant into the Border Regiment on 2 February 1933. He served initially with the 1st Battalion, Border Regiment, in Northern Ireland, until 1935 when he was sent to the 2nd Battalion of the regiment, where he served in India, seeing active service on the North-West Frontier in 1937. While there he received a promotion to lieutenant on 2 February 1936. He remained with the battalion until the outbreak of the Second World War in September 1939. In the same year he married Clodagh, the youngest daughter of Lieutenant Colonel Bertrand Russell; they had three sons.

== Second World War ==
Shortly after war began, Haddon, who on 3 September was promoted to the acting rank of captain, transferred to the 1st Battalion, Borders, then serving in England as part of Brigadier Noel Irwin's 6th Infantry Brigade, itself one of three brigades forming Major General Charles Loyd's 2nd Infantry Division, and was made Officer Commanding (OC) "B" Company. Along with the rest of the division, Haddon's battalion was sent to France in late September where it became part of the British Expeditionary Force (BEF). His rank of captain being made temporary on 3 December, in February 1940 he was made adjutant of his battalion, which in May was transferred to the 125th Brigade, part of the 42nd (East Lancashire) Infantry Division, a Territorial Army (TA) formation, which had only recently arrived in France. Subsequently, when the German Army invaded France three months later, Haddon was involved in the rearguard action towards Dunkirk in late May, from where the battalion, by now having suffered heavy losses and much reduced in men and equipment, were eventually evacuated from Dunkirk to England (see Dunkirk evacuation).

After returning to England the battalion spent most of the rest of 1940 reorganising and reforming after its losses, and preparing to repel an expected German invasion. He remained with the battalion, which in December 1940 transferred to the 31st Independent Brigade, until May 1941 when Haddon, by now a captain (having been promoted on 2 February), left to attend a shortened course at the Staff College, Camberley. After graduating in November he was appointed Assistant Secretary to the Joint Intelligence Sub-Committee of the War Cabinet. Haddon was duty officer on the night of the Japanese attack on Pearl Harbor and the U.S. fleet on 7 December; it was he who passed the news on to Downing Street, leading Prime Minister Winston Churchill to immediately contact U.S. President Franklin D. Roosevelt.

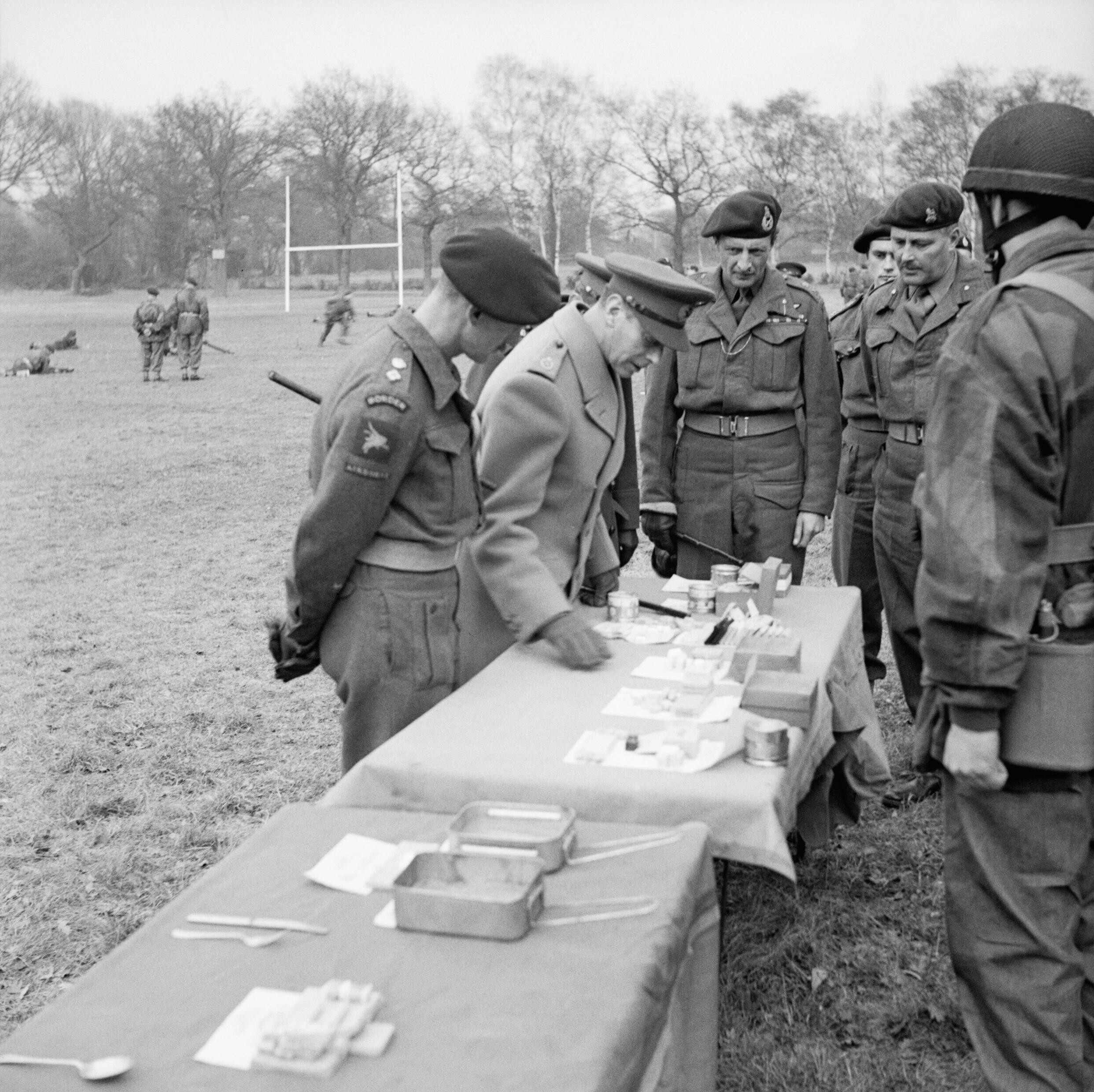
While on a visit to the 1st Airborne Division in March 1944, H.M. The King George VI inspects lightweight compact rations, designed to provide a balanced diet for airborne troops. Stood to his right is Lieutenant Colonel Thomas Haddon, CO of the 1st Battalion, Border Regiment, while Lieutenant-General Frederick Browning, GOC I Airborne Corps, stands two away from him while Brigadier Phillip Hicks, CO of the 1st Airlanding Brigade, is to Browning's left.

He then served throughout 1942 in a variety of staff appointments until, on 27 January 1943, Haddon returned to the 1st Battalion, Border Regiment, now as second-in-command. During Haddon's absence the battalion had been transferred to the airborne forces and converted into a glider infantry unit, and now formed part of Brigadier Philip Hicks's 1st Airlanding Brigade, itself part of the 1st Airborne Division under Major General Frederick Browning. In April the division departed for overseas, arriving in North Africa towards the end of the month, and commenced training for the Allied invasion of Sicily (Operation Husky).

Seeing action in Sicily and North Africa, Haddon was promoted acting lieutenant colonel in command of the 1st battalion of the Border Regiment forming part of the British 1st Airborne Division that, in "Operation Market Garden" attempted to take and hold the Arnhem Bridge, the last bridge across the Rhine, the taking of which would have allowed the Allies to enter Germany before the winter of 1944−1945. However, Haddon was destined to play little part in the Battle of Arnhem. On Sunday 17 September 1944, the first day of "Operation Market Garden", Haddon's glider took off on the first lift from Broadwell airfield, but had to make a forced landing while still over Oxfordshire. On the second glider lift, the next day, 18 September, Haddon's glider had a wing shot off near Antwerp and was forced to make a crash landing, 75 miles from Arnhem and behind enemy lines, so while the 1st Border battalion was fighting for the bridgehead at Arnhem, its commanding officer was proceeding overland, having met up with a battalion of the Dorset Regiment.

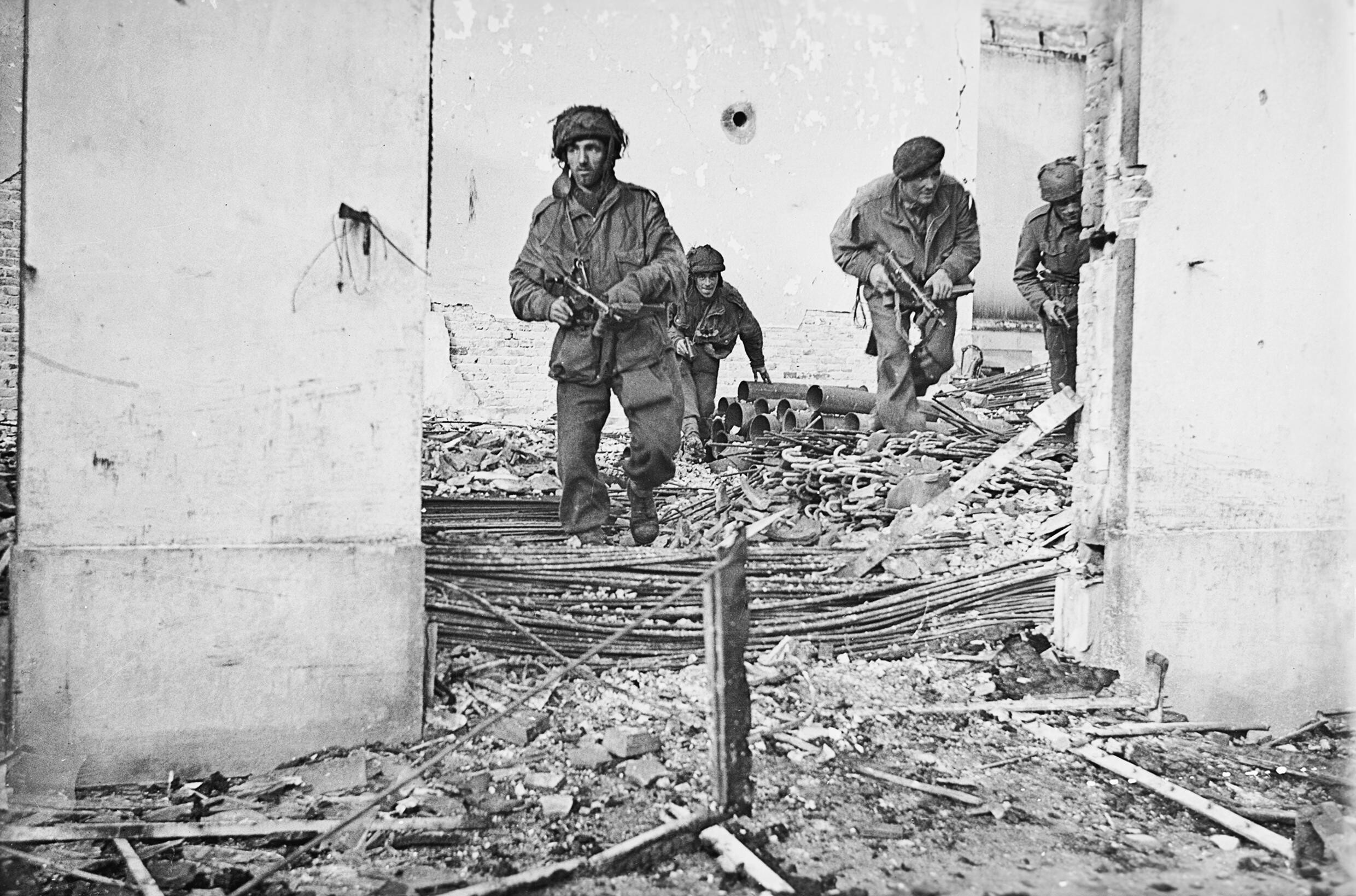
British paratroopers at Oosterbeek

Haddon eventually managed to reach the Oosterbeek area alone late on the following Sunday, 24 September, but was taken prisoner by the Germans the next morning while attempting to find his unit. Haddon was to spend the remainder of the war as a prisoner at Oflag XIIB camp, near Hadamar.

Repatriated, Haddon returned to a staff post with the Chief of Staff Committee, in July 1945 attending the Potsdam Conference and in 1948 returning, as Second-in-Command, to the 1st Border battalion then stationed in Palestine; later in East Africa. Transferred back to the War Office in 1951, in December 1955, and for the second time as its commanding officer, Haddon returned again to the 1st Border battalion, stationed at Göttingen and Berlin as part of the British Army of the Rhine (BAOR).

== Singapore, Hong Kong and final years ==
Promoted to Brigadier in 1958, Haddon raised the Singapore Military Forces (which became in 1961, the Singapore Armed Forces) and was subsequently appointed Chief of Staff, Hong Kong Land Forces.

Haddon was awarded an OBE in 1951, a CBE in 1961, and appointed an aide-de-camp to Queen Elizabeth II, holding that post from 1962 until his retirement in 1968. He maintained association with the Border Regiment as President of the Border Regiment Association in 1966, and Vice-President Border Affairs in the King's Own Royal Border Regimental Association in 1975.

Brigadier Haddon died aged 80 during Easter weekend, 1993. In 1990, he wrote his memoirs, which are available here.
