= Lago di Ogliastro =

Lake in Sicily, Italy

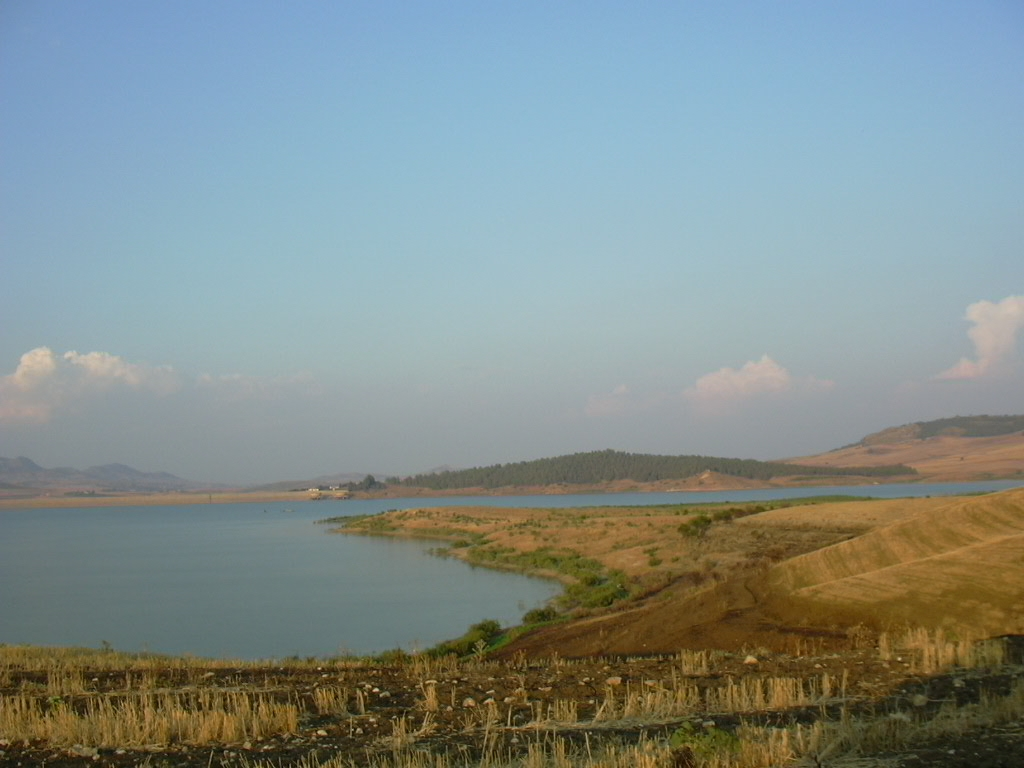

- Location within Sicily
- Location: Province of Enna, Province of Catania, Sicily
- Coordinates: 37°26′42″N 14°34′12″E
- Primary inflows: Gornalunga, Belmontino e Rio Secco
- Primary outflows: Gornalunga
- Catchment area: 468 km^{2} (181 sq mi)
- Basin countries: Italy
- Surface area: 14.2 km^{2} (5.5 sq mi)
- Average depth: 8.7 m (29 ft)
- Max. depth: 41.6 m (136 ft)
- Water volume: 124,000,000 m^{3} (4.4×10^{9} cu ft)
- Residence time: 6 years
- Surface elevation: 214 m (702 ft)

The Lago di Ogliastro is an artificial lake in the province of Enna and the province of Catania, Sicily, Italy. Its waters come from the river Gornalunga, which was dammed to form this lake in the early 1960s. The dam was expanded in 1972. At an elevation of 214 m, its surface area is 14.2 km² and it has an average depth of 8.7 m.
