= Pip Hicks =

Philip Hicks
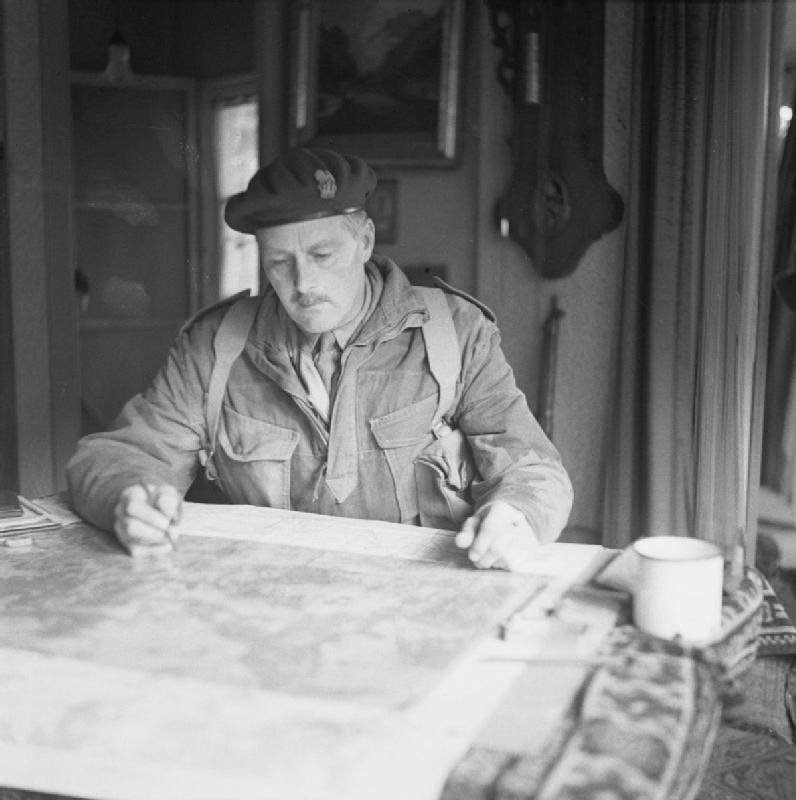
- Brigadier "Pip" Hicks during the advance to Arnhem in 1944
- Born: 25 September 1895; Warwick, Warwickshire
- Died: 8 October 1967 (aged 72); Hartley Wintney, Hampshire
- Military career
- Allegiance: United Kingdom
- Branch: British Army
- Service years: 1914–1948
- Rank: Brigadier
- Nickname: "Pip"
- Service number: 15075
- Unit: Royal Warwickshire Regiment
- Commands: 1st Airlanding Brigade; 2nd Battalion, Royal Warwickshire Regiment
- Conflicts: First World War; Second World War: Operation Husky; Operation Market Garden
- Awards: Commander of the Order of the British Empire; Distinguished Service Order & Bar; Military Cross; Mentioned in Despatches (2)

Brigadier Philip Hugh Whitby Hicks, CBE, DSO & Bar, MC (25 September 1895 – 8 October 1967) was an officer of the British Army during both the First and Second World Wars.

Hicks was commissioned as a second lieutenant in the Royal Warwickshire Regiment in 1914, during the First World War, and fought on the Western Front. In the Second World War he was commander of the 1st Airlanding Brigade, of the 1st Airborne Division. He commanded the brigade in the Mediterranean theatre during Operation Ladbroke, part of the Allied invasion of Sicily, in July 1943, as well as during the Battle of Arnhem, part of Operation Market Garden, in September 1944.

After the Second World War, Hicks retired from the British Army and worked for the International Refugee Organization and the National Playing Fields Association before his death in 1967.

== Early life ==
Hicks was born on 25 September 1895 in Warwick, Warwickshire. The son of Dr Philip Hicks and the writer Beatrice Whitby, he was educated at Winchester College in Hampshire.

== First World War ==
Hicks was a member of the Territorial Force army number 15075, and was commissioned a second lieutenant into the 1/7th Battalion, Royal Warwickshire Regiment, on 23 October 1914. The 1/7th Battalion was serving with the 1/5th, 1/6th and 1/8th battalions as part of the 143rd (1/1st Warwickshire) Brigade, part of the 48th (South Midland) Division, which took part in the Battle of the Somme in 1916 and the third Battle of Ypres in 1917. Hicks was granted a regular army commission on 23 June 1916. Hicks was mentioned in despatches on 13 November, while serving with the 7th Battalion.

In May 1918, Hicks transferred to the 1st Battalion, Royal Warwickshire Regiment, which was part of the 10th Brigade of the 4th Division. While serving with the 4th Division he was awarded a Military Cross in 1918, during the Hundred Days Offensive in the final months of the war. The citation stated:

For conspicuous gallantry and devotion to duty during a daylight raid. He commanded his party in a most skilful manner, and was largely responsible for its success. About 50 of the enemy were killed, several of whom were shot by him with his revolver, and two prisoners taken. His conduct was splendid.

On 8 November 1918, Hicks was again mentioned in despatches.

== Between the wars ==
Hicks remained in the army after the First World War and was promoted to captain in January 1922. He served in British India from November 1924 to January 1926. The following year, on 19 November 1927, he married Patty Fanshawe, the daughter of Brigadier Lionel Arthur Fanshawe. They had two children, a son and a daughter. In November 1924 Hicks became the aide-de-camp to the district commander at Karachi until January 1926. In March 1931, he returned to the Royal Warwickshire Regiment, joining the 2nd Battalion at Khartoum. His next appointment was as the staff captain to the Guernsey and Alderney district between April 1933 and March 1936, when he was promoted to major. In January 1937 Hicks returned to the 2nd Battalion, Royal Warwickshire Regiment, which was now back in the United Kingdom and based at Tidworth Camp. He remained with the 2nd Battalion until January 1939, when he transferred again to the 1st Battalion, Royal Warwickshire Regiment, which was serving in Faizabad at the time.

== Second World War ==
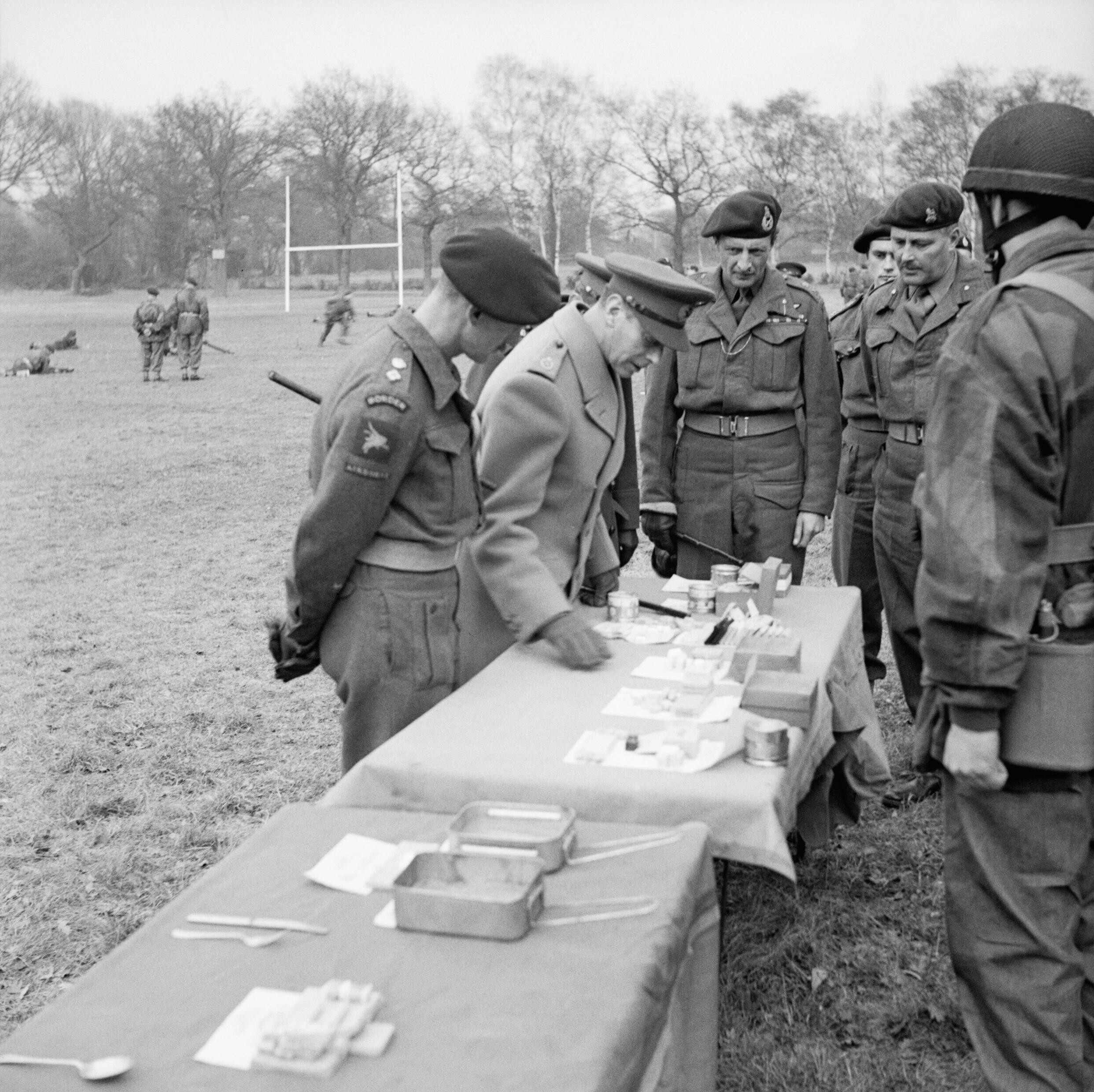
While on a visit to the 1st Airborne Division in March 1944, King George VI inspects lightweight compact rations, designed to provide a balanced diet for airborne troops. Stood to his right is Lieutenant Colonel Thomas Haddon, while Lieutenant General Frederick Browning stands two away from him and Brigadier Phillip Hicks is to Browning's left.

At the start of the Second World War in September 1939, Hicks was still a major, but was promoted to acting lieutenant colonel in May 1940 and commander of the 2nd Battalion, Royal Warwickshire Regiment, which from February 1940 was serving in the 144th Brigade of the 48th (South Midland) Infantry Division. The battalion played a prominent part in the Battle of Dunkirk, part of the Battle of France, for which Hicks was awarded a Distinguished Service Order (DSO).

In 1942, Hicks was given command of an airborne formation, the 1st Airlanding Brigade, part of the 1st Airborne Division, and in 1943 was promoted to brigadier. During Operation Ladbroke – part of the Allied invasion of Sicily – Hicks's glider landed in the sea 1 mile (1.6 km) offshore. Hicks and the other men on board decided to swim ashore. Once there he gathered a force together and prepared to attack a coastal artillery battery. For his actions in Sicily Hicks was awarded a second DSO. The citation stated:

Brigadier Hicks commanded and led the 1st Airlanding Brigade in its moonlight attack at Syracuse on the night 9–10 July 1943. His own glider landed in the sea. He and his party swam ashore and took part in the fighting against enemy coast defences. Throughout the entire operation Brigadier Hicks showed the highest qualities of leadership, courage and devotion to duty.

During the Battle of Arnhem, part of Operation Market Garden, on the night of 17–18 September, the commander of the 1st Airborne Division, Major-General Roy Urquhart, was reported missing and Brigadier Hicks assumed command of the 1st Airborne Division during a crucial period. Hicks's brigade went on to sustain severe casualties over the next few days before being withdrawn to the United Kingdom with less than half of its original strength.

After the battle was over, Field Marshal Sir Bernard Montgomery wrote in a letter to the Chief of the Imperial General Staff (CIGS), Field Marshal Sir Alan Brooke, that, "There is no doubt Hicks did extremely well at Arnhem, but there is also no doubt that it has been too much for him and he is not now fit to fight again in battle in this war." Montgomery went on to recommend that Hicks be considered for command of an area in England or overseas. Hicks was succeeded in command of the brigade by Brigadier Roger Bower.

On 23 March 1945, Hicks was appointed a Commander of the Order of the British Empire.

== Later life ==
In May 1948 Hicks retired from the army and became a regional commissioner for the International Refugee Organization in Germany between 1948 and 1952. He followed this by being on the board of the National Playing Fields Association in London, between 1955 and 1961. Hicks died on 8 October 1967 at Hartley Wintney in Hampshire.

== Bibliography ==
- Dover, Major Victor (1981). The Sky Generals. Cassell. ISBN 0-304-30480-8.
- Tugwell, Maurice (1971). Airborne to battle: a history of airborne warfare, 1918-1971. London: Kimber. ISBN 0-7183-0262-1. OCLC 281786.
- Hamilton, Nigel (1986). Monty: The Final Years of the Field Marshal 1944-1976. McGraw-Hill Book Company.
