= Ethel R. Harraden =

English pianist, composer and music critic

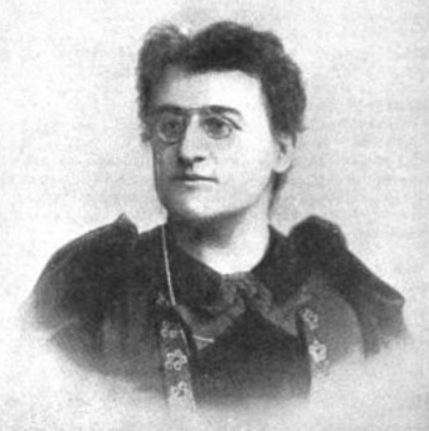
- In The Sketch, 23 January 1895
- Born: Ethel Rosalie Harraden; 1857; Islington, Middlesex, England
- Died: 5 January 1917 (aged 59–60); Leamington Spa, Warwickshire, England
- Education: Royal Academy of Music
- Occupation(s): Pianist, composer, music critic
- Spouse: Frank Glover

Ethel Rosalie Glover (née Harraden; 1857–1917) was an English pianist, composer and music critic.

== Life ==
Ethel Rosalie Harraden was born in Islington, Middlesex, England, in 1857, the daughter of Rosalie and Samuel Harraden, a London/Calcutta agent, and studied at the Royal Academy of Music. After completing her studies, she worked as a pianist and composer. She married Frank Glover and settled in Leamington Spa. Harraden became interested in composing for the stage, sometimes collaborating with her brother Herbert Harraden. She reviewed for the Leamington Spa Courier, a newspaper owned by her husband.

Ethel was the third of six children, including her youngest sister Beatrice Harraden (born in 1864), who became a novelist known for "Ships that Pass in the Night."

Grandchildren: Norah Rigby Childs nee Glover

She died on 5 January 1917 at Leamington Spa.

== Works ==
Harraden composed mostly ballads and stage music. Her works include:

- Two Melodies
- Tristesse for Cello and Piano (1886, Schott Music)
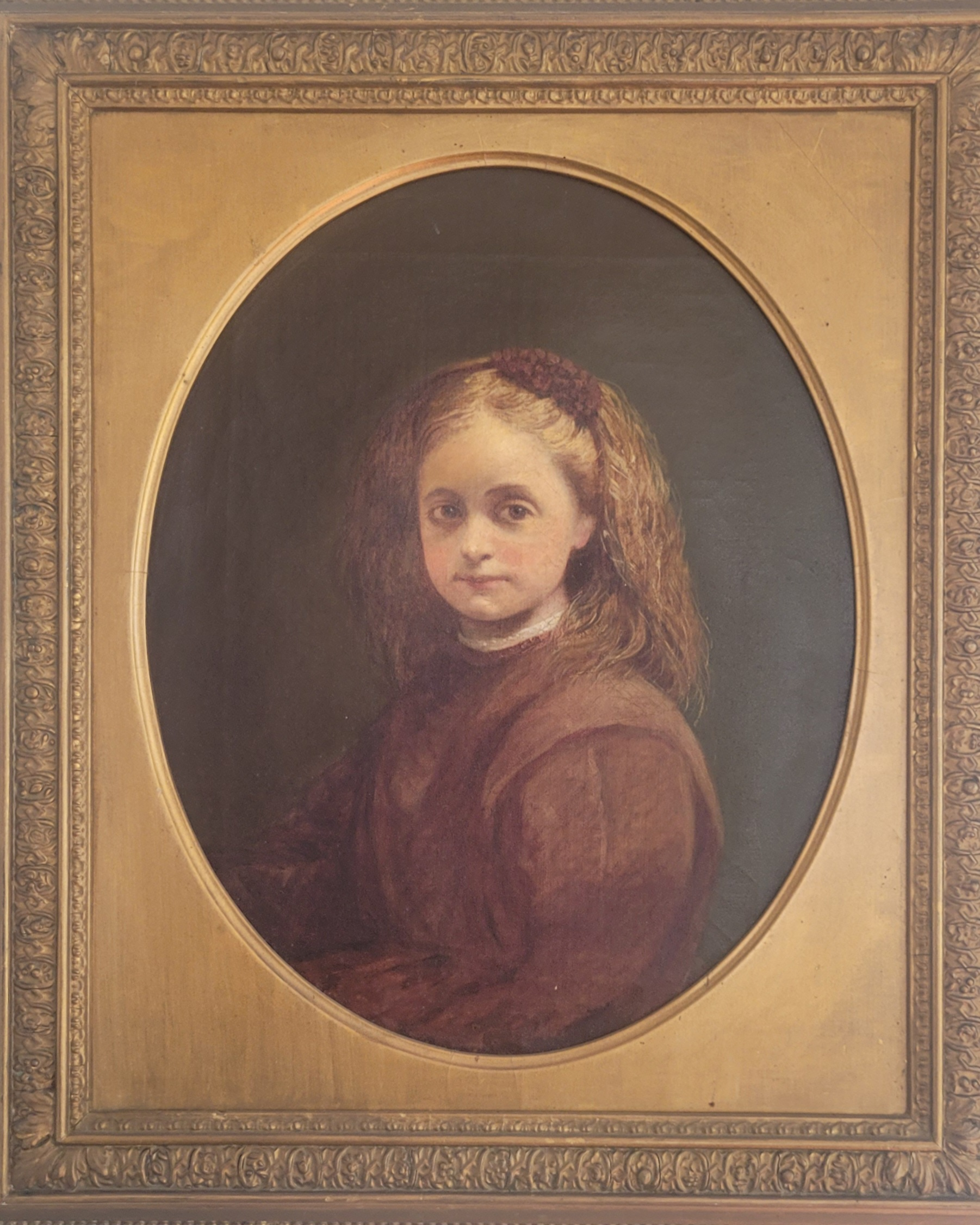
- Ethel Harraden: approx. 8 years old (1865)
  I go to prove my soul (Text: Robert Browning) (c. 1884)
- The Rainy Day (Text: Henry Wadsworth Longfellow)
- Pearl, cantata
- His Last Chance, operetta (1890)
- The Lady in Pink, operetta (1891)
- The Taboo, opera fantastie (1895)
