= Gornalunga =

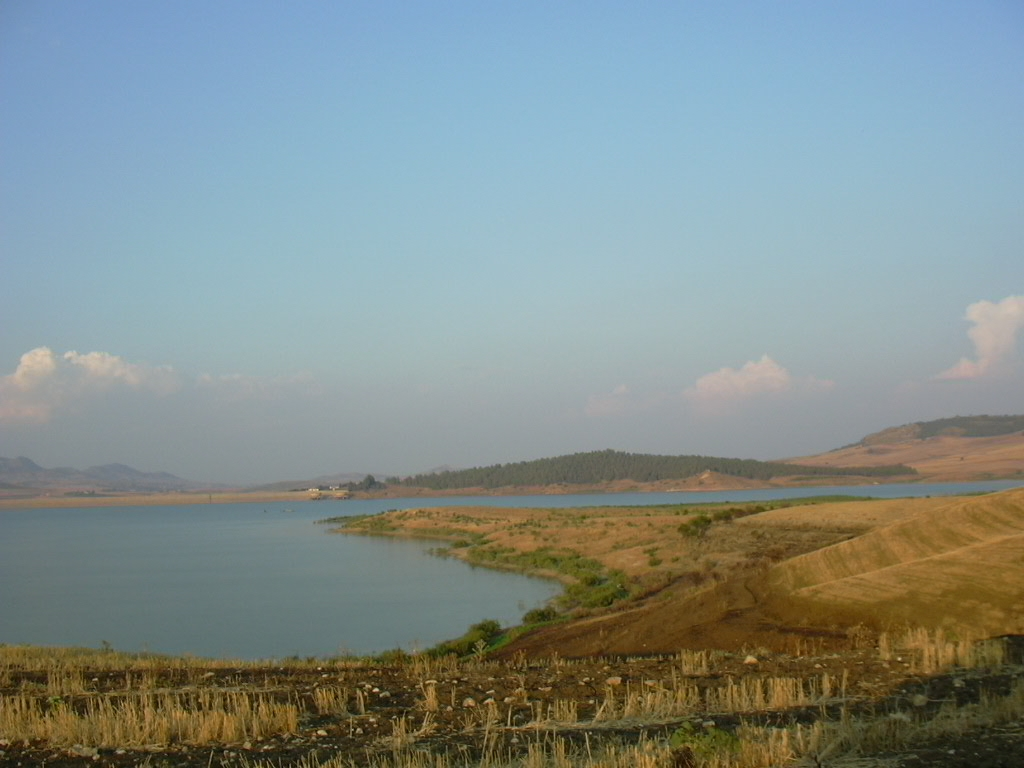

Location
- Country: Italy
- Region: Sicily

Physical characteristics
- Source
  - location: Monte Rossomanno; Erean Mountains
  - elevation: 889 m (2,917 ft)
- Mouth: Simeto
  - coordinates: 37.4010°N 15.0608°E
- Length: 81 km (50 mi)
- Discharge
  - average: 5 m^{3}/s (180 cu ft/s)

Basin features
- Progression: Simeto→ Ionian Sea

The Gornalunga is an 81-kilometre-long (50 mi) river located in central-eastern Sicily.

The river rises at Monte Rossomanno, in the Erean Mountains, in the province of Enna. After flowing through the plain of Catania, the river becomes a tributary of the Simeto river just a few kilometres before reaching the Mediterranean coast.

Along its course, the Gornalunga forms the artificial lake, Lago di Ogliastro, and touches three provinces, Enna, Catania and Syracuse.

== History ==
=== World War II ===
The Gornalunga River served as a British defensive point during Operation Husky, the Allied operation to invade Sicily. On the 18th of July, 1943, the Commander of the 8th British Army, Sir Bernard Montgomery, attempted and succeeded in crossing the river.
