= Hugh Whitby =

English cricketer and educator

Personal information
- Full name: Hugh Owen Whitby
- Born: 12 April 1864; Ottery St Mary, Devon, England
- Died: 14 October 1934 (aged 70); Tonbridge, Kent, England
- Batting: Right-handed
- Bowling: Right-arm fast

Domestic team information
- Years: Team
- 1884–1887: Oxford University

Career statistics
Competition	First-class
Matches	29
Runs scored	224
Batting average	6.58
100s/50s	–/–
Top score	24
Balls bowled	5,110
Wickets	119
Bowling average	19.67
5 wickets in innings	10
10 wickets in match	2
Best bowling	8/82
Catches/stumpings	17/–
- Source: Cricinfo, 27 August 2019

Hugh Owen Whitby (12 April 1864 – 14 October 1934) was an English first-class cricketer and educator.

The son of Charles Whitby, he was born in Devon at Ottery St Mary in April 1864. He was educated at Leamington College, before going up to Lincoln College, Oxford. While studying at Oxford, he made his debut in first-class cricket for Oxford University against the touring Australians at Oxford in 1884, where he took figures of 8 for 82 in the Australians first-innings to help Oxford to a famous seven wicket victory. He played first-class cricket for Oxford until 1887, making 25 appearances. A prolific right-arm fast bowler, he took 108 wickets for Oxford at an average of 19.43. He took five wickets in an innings on ten occasions and took ten wickets in a match twice, with best his best innings figures remaining his 8 for 82 on debut. His debut season was his most prolific, with 58 wickets at an average 16.22, followed by the 33 wickets he took at an average of 12.84 in 1886, with his form dipping in this final year at Oxford, when he took 15 wickets at an average of 30.46. Whitby gained his cricket blue in his freshman year. In addition to playing first-class cricket for Oxford, he also played for the Gentlemen in the Gentlemen v Players fixture of 1884 and for an England XI against the Australians at Edgbaston in 1886. He also toured North America in September 1885 with a team formed by the Devon amateur E. J. Sanders, making two first-class appearances on the tour against the Gentlemen of Philadelphia at Germantown.

After graduating from Oxford he became a schoolteacher. He was an assistant master at Derby School from 1886–89, before becoming a master at Tonbridge School from 1889 until his retirement in 1919. Following his retirement, he was a popular figure in the pavilion at Lord's. Whitby died at Tonbridge in October 1934.
