= List of World War II British airborne battalions =

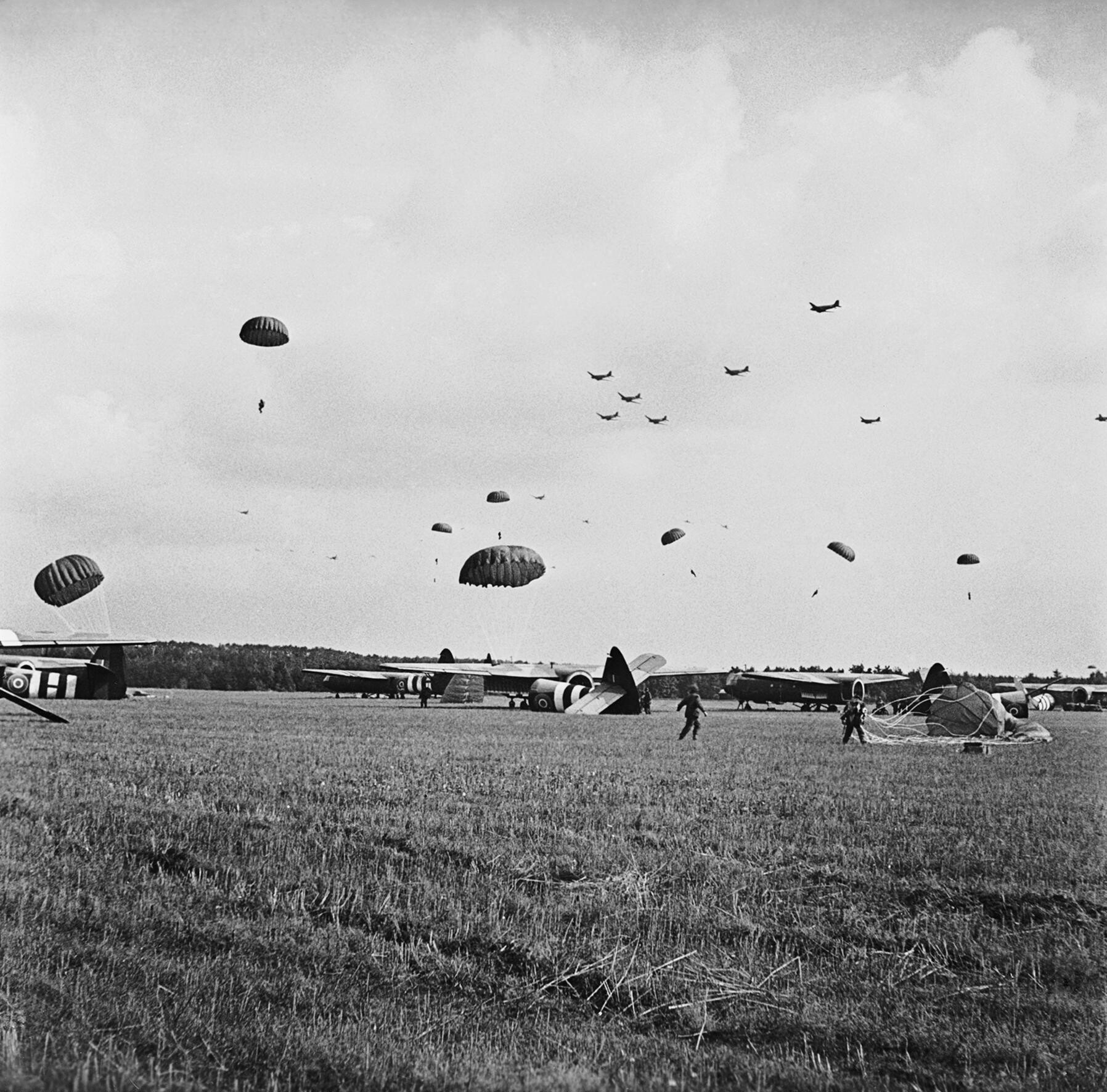
1st Airborne Division paratroopers and gliders during the Battle of Arnhem.

The British airborne forces, during the Second World War, consisted of the Parachute Regiment, the Glider Pilot Regiment, the airlanding battalions, and from 1944 the Special Air Service Troops. Their formation followed the success of the German airborne operations, during the Battle of France. The British Prime Minister, Winston Churchill, directed the War Office to investigate the possibility of creating a corps of 5,000 parachute troops.

On 22 June 1940, No. 2 Commando was turned over to parachute duties and on 21 November, re-designated the 11th Special Air Service Battalion, with a parachute and glider wing. It was 38 men of this battalion who on 10 February 1941 took part in Operation Colossus the first British airborne operation. In September, the battalion was re-designated the 1st Parachute Battalion. A request for volunteers for parachute duties provided enough men to form the 2nd, 3rd and 4th Parachute Battalions. The volunteers for glider-borne infantry were formed into airlanding battalions from December 1941.

The success of early British airborne operations prompted the War Office to expand the existing airborne force, setting up the Airborne Forces Depot and Battle School in Derbyshire in April 1942, and creating the Parachute Regiment. The fledgling force received another boost following the German success in the Battle of Crete, when the War Office issued a communiqué.

The Airborne Forces of the British Army consists of the parachute troops and glider-borne troops of all arms of service. Officers and men in any regiment or corps, may apply for transfer to a parachute or glider-borne unit of the Airborne Forces.

By the end of the war the British Army had raised seventeen parachute and eight airlanding battalions. These battalions served in seven parachute brigades, three airlanding brigades and three airborne divisions. Some British battalions served in the Far East with Indian Army formations. One Canadian parachute battalion served in a British parachute brigade and a Polish parachute brigade served with a British division.

Almost all the battalions played some part in British airborne operations. The first of which was a platoon sized operation in Italy. The second a company parachute landing in France. Building experience all the time these operations were followed by three battalion sized parachute landings in Tunisia. Parachute and airlanding brigades carried out landings in Sicily and the south of France. But the pinnacle of British airborne operations, were three divisional landings at Normandy, Arnhem and the River Rhine crossing in Germany.

The British airborne forces were easily identified by their distinctive uniform. The maroon beret, the airborne forces patch of Bellerophon riding the flying horse Pegasus and parachute wings worn on the right shoulder of trained parachutists. (Note: The maroon beret has since become the symbol of airborne forces worldwide. The airborne forces patch was chosen by Lieutenant General Frederick Browning. The emblem was designed in May 1942 by Major Edward Seago, to be worn on the arms of all Airborne soldiers.) On operations, airborne forces wore their own pattern steel helmet instead of the standard British Brodie helmet and after 1942, the camouflaged Denison smock was issued to airborne forces.

== Battalions ==
Battalion	Active in role	Brigade	Division	Operations	Image
1st Parachute Battalion	1941–1945	1st Parachute Brigade	1st Airborne Division	Operation Torch; Operation Fustian; Operation Slapstick; Operation Market Garden	
1st Border Regiment	1941–1945	1st Airlanding Brigade	1st Airborne Division	Operation Ladbroke; Operation Slapstick; Operation Market Garden; Operation Doomsday	
1st Royal Ulster Rifles	1941–1945	1st Airlanding Brigade (Note: 1st Airlanding Brigade until May 1943, then transferred to the 6th.); 6th Airlanding Brigade	1st Airborne Division; 6th Airborne Division	Operation Tonga; Battle of the Bulge; Operation Varsity	
No. 1 Wing, Glider Pilot Regiment (Note: Trained as soldiers first, the Glider Pilot Regiment consisted of two wings. Each wing was the equivalent of to a small infantry battalion.)	1941–1945	Glider Pilot Brigade (Note: The two wings of the Glider Pilot Regiment were trained to fight as a two battalion brigade.)		Operation Tonga; Operation Mallard; Operation Market Garden; Operation Varsity (Note: Operation Dragoon and Operation Manna in the Mediterranean were carried out by an independent Glider Pilot Squadron the equivalent of an infantry company.)	
1st SAS Regiment (Note: The SAS regiments became part of the British Airborne forces in March 1944, and were placed in a brigade formation called Special Air Service Troops, or otherwise known as the SAS Brigade.)	1941–1945	SAS Brigade		Operation Houndsworth; Operation Bulbasket; Operation Archway (Note: Only operation while attached to airborne forces included)	
2nd Parachute Battalion	1941–1945	1st Parachute Brigade	1st Airborne Division	Operation Biting; Operation Torch; Operation Fustian; Operation Slapstick; Operation Market Garden	
2nd South Staffordshire Regiment	1941–1945	1st Airlanding Brigade	1st Airborne Division	Operation Ladbroke; Operation Slapstick; Operation Market Garden; Operation Doomsday	
2nd Ox and Bucks Light Infantry	1941–1945	1st Airlanding Brigade (Note: 1st Airlanding Brigade until May 1943, then transferred to the 6th.); 6th Airlanding Brigade	1st Airborne Division; 6th Airborne Division	Operation Tonga; Battle of the Bulge; Operation Varsity	
2nd King's Own Royal Regiment	1945	14th Airlanding Brigade	44th Indian Airborne Division	Participated in Chindit operations.	
2nd Black Watch	1945	14th Airlanding Brigade	44th Indian Airborne Division	Participated in Chindit operations.	
No. 2 Wing, Glider Pilot Regiment	1941–1945	Glider Pilot Brigade		Operation Freshman; Operation Ladbroke; Operation Fustian; Operation Market Garden; Operation Varsity	
2nd SAS Regiment	1943–1945	SAS Brigade		Operation Loyton; Operation Archway; Operation Tombola (Note: Only operation while attached to airborne forces included)	
3rd Parachute Battalion	1941–1945	1st Parachute Brigade	1st Airborne Division	Operation Torch; Operation Fustian; Operation Slapstick; Operation Market Garden	
4th Parachute Battalion	1942–1945	2nd Parachute Brigade (Note: Part of the 1st Airborne Division until November 1943 when it became an independent parachute brigade)	1st Airborne Division	Operation Fustian; Operation Slapstick; Operation Rugby; Operation Manna	
5th Parachute Battalion (Note: Converted to a parachute battalion from the 7th Queen's Own Cameron Highlanders.)	1942–1945	2nd Parachute Brigade (Note: Part of the 1st Airborne Division until November 1943 when it became an independent parachute brigade)	1st Airborne Division	Operation Fustian; Operation Slapstick; Operation Rugby; Operation Manna	
6th Parachute Battalion (Note: Converted to a parachute battalion from the 10th Royal Welch Fusiliers.)	1942–1948	2nd Parachute Brigade (Note: 1st Airborne Division until November 1943 when it became an independent parachute brigade)	1st Airborne Division	Operation Fustian; Operation Slapstick; Operation Rugby; Operation Manna	
7th Parachute Battalion (Note: Converted to a parachute battalion from the 10th Somerset Light Infantry.)	1942–1945	3rd Parachute Brigade (Note: Until August 1943 replaced by the 1st Canadian Parachute Battalion.); 5th Parachute Brigade	6th Airborne Division	Operation Tonga; Battle of the Bulge; Operation Varsity	
7th King's Own Scottish Borderers	1943–1945	1st Airlanding Brigade	1st Airborne Division	Operation Ladbroke; Operation Slapstick; Operation Market Garden; Operation Doomsday	
8th Parachute Battalion (Note: Converted to a parachute battalion from the 13th Royal Warwickshire Regiment.)	1942–1945	3rd Parachute Brigade	6th Airborne Division	Operation Tonga; Battle of the Bulge; Operation Varsity	
9th Parachute Battalion (Note: Converted to a parachute battalion from the 10th Essex Regiment.)	1942–1945	3rd Parachute Brigade	6th Airborne Division	Operation Tonga; Battle of the Bulge; Operation Varsity	
10th Parachute Battalion (Note: Formed in Indian from volunteers from the 2nd, 4th and 5th Battalions, Royal Sussex Regiment. It was disbanded after the battle of Arnhem.)	1943–1944	4th Parachute Brigade	1st Airborne Division	Operation Slapstick; Operation Market Garden	
11th Parachute Battalion (Note: Formed from volunteers from the 156th Parachute Battalion. It was disbanded after the battle of Arnhem.)	1943–1944	4th Parachute Brigade	1st Airborne Division	Operation Slapstick; Operation Market Garden	
11th Special Air Service Battalion	1940–1941			Operation Colossus	
12th Parachute Battalion (Note: Converted to a parachute battalion from the 10th Green Howards.)	1943–1945	5th Parachute Brigade	6th Airborne Division	Operation Tonga; Battle of the Bulge; Operation Varsity	
12th Devonshire Regiment	1943–1945	6th Airlanding Brigade	6th Airborne Division	Operation Tonga; Operation Varsity	
13th Parachute Battalion (Note: Converted to a parachute battalion from the 2/4th South Lancashire Regiment.)	1943–1945	5th Parachute Brigade	6th Airborne Division	Operation Tonga; Battle of the Bulge; Operation Varsity	
15th Parachute Battalion (Note: Converted to a parachute battalion from the 13th King's Regiment (Liverpool).)	1945	77th Indian Parachute Brigade	44th Indian Airborne Division	Participated in Chindit operations before converting to parachute duties.	
16th Parachute Battalion (Note: Converted to a parachute battalion with volunteers from the 1st South Staffordshire Regiment.)	1945	50th Indian Parachute Brigade	44th Indian Airborne Division	Participated in Chindit operations before converting to parachute duties.	
17th Parachute Battalion	1945	1st Parachute Brigade	1st Airborne Division		
151st Parachute Battalion (Note: Formed in India from volunteers of 27 British infantry battalions in India. The unit moved to Egypt and then to England and renamed 156 Parachute Bn and formed part of the 4th Parachute Brigade)	1942	50th Indian Parachute Brigade			
156th Parachute Battalion (Note: Renumbered from the 151st Parachute Battalion in December 1942. It was disbanded after the battle of Arnhem.)	1942–1944	4th Parachute Brigade	1st Airborne Division	Operation Slapstick; Operation Market Garden	

== Notes ==
Footnotes

Citations
