= 16th Parachute Brigade =

- Active: 1948–1977
- Country: United Kingdom
- Branch: British Army
- Role: Parachute infantry
- Size: Brigade

Insignia
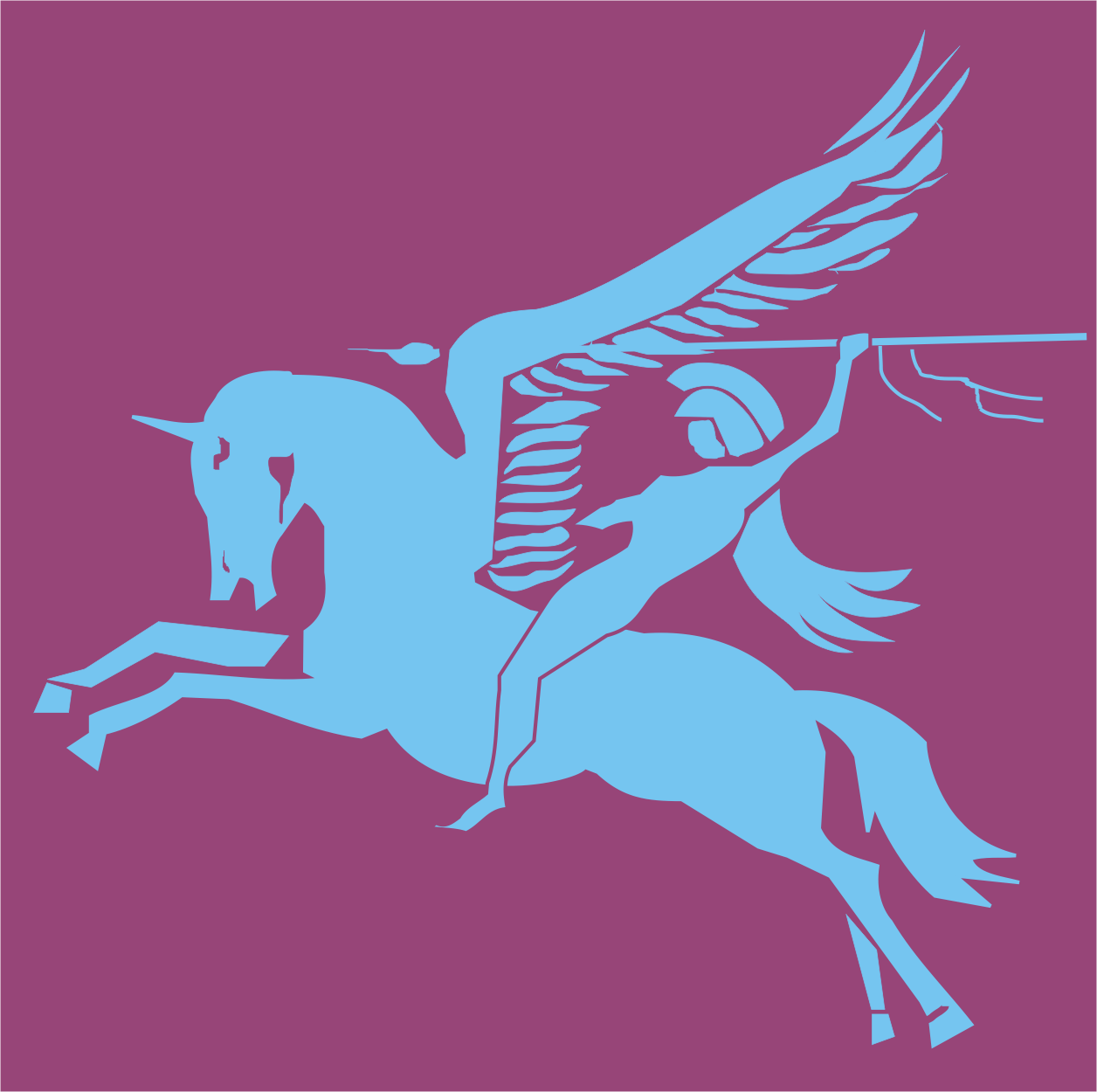
- Emblem of the British airborne forces

The 16th Parachute Brigade was an airborne infantry brigade of the British Army.

In February 1948 the 2nd Independent Parachute Brigade left the 6th Airborne Division and moved to Germany, becoming part of the British Army of the Rhine. The 6th Airborne Division was disbanded soon afterwards, leaving the 2nd Independent Parachute Brigade as the only brigade-sized airborne formation in the British Army. In June the 5th (Scottish) Parachute Battalion was renumbered the 2nd Battalion, The Parachute Regiment, the 4th/6th Parachute Battalion became the 1st Battalion, and the 7th (Light Infantry) Parachute Battalion became the 3rd Battalion, whilst the 1st (Guards) Parachute Battalion was reduced to a single company, becoming No. 1 (Guards) Independent Parachute Company. Finally, on 25 June 1948, the brigade was re-designated as the 16th Independent Parachute Brigade Group, taking the "1" and "6" from the two wartime airborne divisions, the 1st and 6th.

1st and 3rd Battalions The Parachute Regiment arrived in Cyprus in January 1956 as part of 16th Independent Parachute Brigade Group. From 17 May to 7 June 1956, Britain launched Operation "Pepper Pot" between Lefka, Lyssi, and Troodos in Cyprus, an operation that was carried out by 16th Parachute Brigade Group. However, an informant within the Special Branch alerted Georgios Grivas of the operation, and as such EOKA was better prepared for the British forces which led to the operation having little effect.

In 1956 as the Suez Crisis arose, the Brigade Group, which was intended to be the main British strike force against Egypt, was heavily involved in the Cyprus Emergency. Paratroop training had been neglected in favour of counter-insurgency operations. During Operation Musketeer the brigade helped seize the area around Port Said.

In July 1960, the brigade was re-designated as the 16th Parachute Brigade Group removing the word "Independent" from the title. In January 1965, the brigade was re-designated as the 16th Parachute Brigade removing the word "Group" from the title. The Army Restructuring Plan 1975 assigned the United Kingdom Mobile Force (UKMF) role to the brigade to replace 3rd Division which meant the loss of airborne status. On 1 April 1977, 16th Parachute Brigade reorganised and was re-designated as the 6th Field Force . On 1 April 1978, the 6th Field Force assumed the full role of the UKMF.
