= Operation Rugby =

WWII Allied operation in France

2nd Parachute Brigade in Southern France
- Part of Operation Dragoon
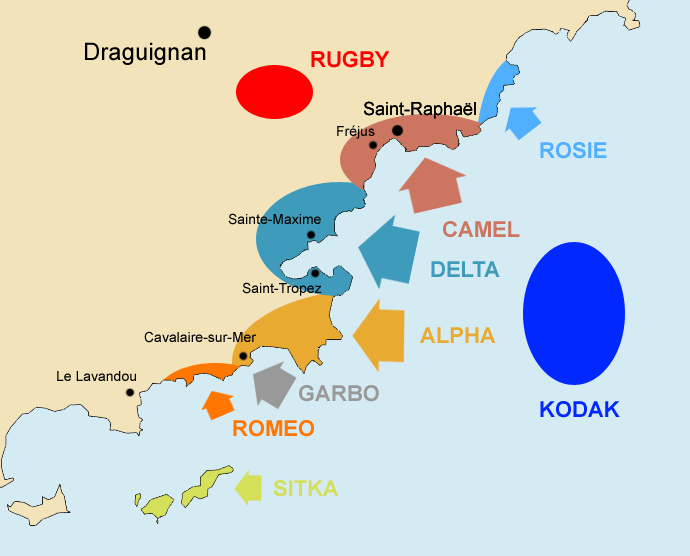
- Map of the Dragoon landings, the airborne landings Operation Rugby highlighted in red
Date	15–26 August 1944
Location	Southern France 43°28′19″N 6°33′59″W
Result	Allied success

Belligerents
United Kingdom	Germany

Commanders and leaders
Charles Hilary Vaughan Pritchard	Johannes Baessler

Units involved
2nd Parachute Brigade	242nd Infantry Division

Casualties and losses
51 dead 130 wounded 181 missing ^	Unknown but around 350 prisoners taken
- ^ Some of the missing later reported for duty

The British 2nd Parachute Brigade was part of the Operation Rugby airborne landings in August 1944. The operation was carried out by an ad hoc airborne formation called the 1st Airborne Task Force. Operation Rugby was itself part of the Operation Dragoon invasion of Southern France by the American 7th Army. The airborne task force landed in the River Argens valley with the objective of preventing German reinforcements from reaching the landing beaches. The landings were mainly an American operation and the brigade was the only British Army formation involved.

The brigade's pathfinders landed accurately and set up their homing beacons, but the main body of the brigade landed over a large area, some 20 miles (32 km) away. The following glider force also had problems; weather conditions forced the brigade's anti-tank unit to turn back for Italy and return with the second wave later that day. Eventually the brigade captured their primary objectives, but the lack of manpower meant that their secondary objective of Le Muy was given to the American airborne forces. The seaborne and airborne landings linked up within two days, and the brigade became the reserve formation for the operation.

As a British withdrawal from France at the earliest opportunity had been the original intent, the brigade boarded ships bound for Italy eleven days after landing. The operation had cost the brigade 362 casualties, but this did not hinder their next mission in Greece two months later. Only 126 replacements were required to bring the brigade back up to full strength.

== Background ==
=== 2nd Parachute Brigade ===
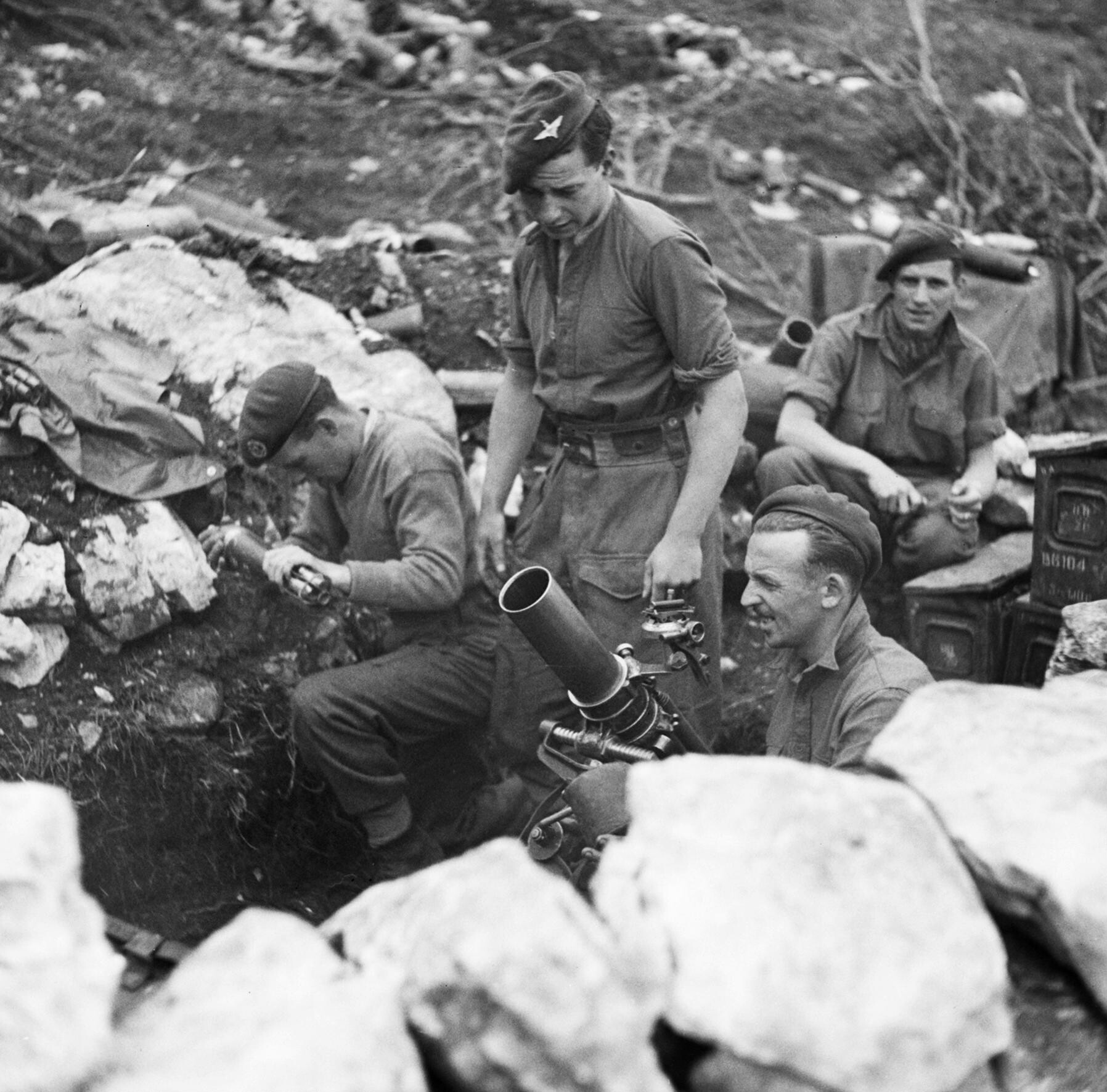
4th Parachute Battalion mortar team in action, Italy 1944

Commanded by Brigadier Charles Hilary Vaughan Pritchard, the 2nd Parachute Brigade formed in 1942 and was assigned to the 1st Airborne Division. It comprised three parachute battalions, with their own artillery and engineer support. Although the brigade had not been involved in the division's operations in Sicily, it took part in Operation Slapstick, the landing at Taranto in Italy. At the end of 1943, when the 1st Airborne Division returned to the United Kingdom, the brigade remained behind fighting in the Italian Campaign. Since then, the brigade had taken part in patrols probing German lines, and the battles at Cassino and along the Sangro river at the Bernhardt Line. Previously, their only parachute mission had been Operation Hasty, which required only sixty men from the brigade.

=== Operation Dragoon ===
The Allied invasion of Southern France during the Second World War was given the code name Operation Dragoon. It would take place in the South of France, between Cannes and Toulon in August 1944. The landings would be undertaken by the U.S. Seventh Army, with the French First Army landing after the beachhead was secure. Following the success of the Normandy airborne landings, Allied planners wanted to use an airborne force to support the invasion. However the divisions in Europe, the American 82nd and 101st Airborne Division, had participated in the Normandy landings and were refitting for further operations to support the advance in France and the Low Countries. The two British divisions were also unavailable; the 1st Airborne Division was preparing for operations in Northern Europe and the 6th Airborne Division was still fighting in Normandy.

The only other Allied airborne divisions were three American units. However, the 11th Airborne Division was fighting in the Pacific War, while the 13th and 17th Airborne Divisions were back in the United States training.

== Prelude ==
=== 1st Airborne Task Force ===
Lack of an available airborne division forced the Allies to assemble an ad hoc formation, the 1st Airborne Task Force, in Italy on 1 July 1944. Its objective was to land in the River Argens valley between Le Muy and Le Luc to prevent any German reinforcements reaching the landing beaches.

The task force initially comprised the American 517th Parachute Regimental Combat Team, reinforced by the 509th, and the 1st/551st parachute infantry battalions and their only glider infantry battalion, the 550th. Command of the task force was given to Brigadier General Robert T. Frederick, who had previously commanded the 1st Special Service Force. To provide additional manpower, the experienced 2nd Parachute Brigade, was attached to the task force. But they would only stay in France until the beachhead had been established and the seaborne and airborne elements had linked up. Initially two Free French parachute battalions had been assigned to the task force, but they were withdrawn for a potential French airborne landing in the Massif Central. When the Americans and British refused to endorse the French plan, as it offered no support to operations in Normandy or to Dragoon, the French commander General de Gaulle would not allow them to be used in the landings.

In the initial plan for Operation Rugby, the codename for the airborne landings, the 2nd Parachute Brigade would land to the west of Le Muy, only 10 miles (16 km) from the coast. The American 517th Regimental Combat Team would land beside Le Luc, and the 509th and 551st Battalions near Carnoules. They would then hold the high ground and junctions along the main road through the Argens valley from Frejus to Toulon. This plan had the units widely separated and any German resistance or counterattack could cut off and destroy the task force piecemeal before help arrived from the landing beaches.

A revised plan produced on 12 July had the 2nd Parachute Brigade landing at the same place, but all the Americans would land at a large drop zone between Le Muy and Grimaud, only 2 miles (3.2 km) to the west of St Tropez. The task force's staff were still not satisfied with the mission and on 15 July proposed a third plan. The new plan placed all the task force drop zones around 2 miles (3.2 km) from Le Muy. In the first wave of landings, the 2nd Parachute Brigade drop zone was to the north of Le Muy, with their objective to capture Le Muy and the surrounding area including the village of La Motte. At the same time the 517th Regiment would land to the west of Le Muy and the 509th Battalion to the southeast.

A shortage of aircraft played a role in transporting the task force to France, which had to be divided into two large groups and a small glider group for the British. On D-Day the first large group would be transported to France by 394 aircraft and eighty gliders. A second group of 325 aircraft and 270 gliders would arrive in the afternoon. The smaller British group consisting of the 2nd Parachute Brigade's glider forces would arrive shortly after the first group in the morning. In total 9,099 troops, 221 vehicles and 213 artillery guns would be delivered to France during Operation Rugby.

=== German forces ===
The German forces in the area of the landings were under the command of Army Group G, and also divided between the 1st Army in the west and the 19th Army in the east. In June 1944, these three headquarters commanded three panzer divisions, around thirteen infantry divisions and some smaller formations. By this stage of the war, many of these divisions were lacking modern equipment, inexperienced and under-trained. The troops were mainly elderly, or not fit for service in a first class division. Some divisions had several complete battalions formed by the Ostlegionen (conscripted foreigners from Poland and Russia). Four of the divisions were static or garrison divisions and five were reserve formations that had only been used in an internal security role against the French Resistance.

After the Normandy landings many of these units moved north. Replacements that joined Army Group G came to refit after the fighting in Normandy or on the Eastern Front. They were under strength, with little or no equipment.

By August 1944, the 19th Army comprised the 11th Panzer Division, the 198th, 242nd, 244th, 338th, 716th infantry divisions and the 148th, 157th and 189th reserve divisions, all of which were still under strength and lacking equipment. In the Argens valley area, where the 2nd Parachute Brigade would be landing, was the 242nd Infantry Division commanded by Generalleutnant Johannes Baessler.

== Operation Rugby ==
=== D-Day ===
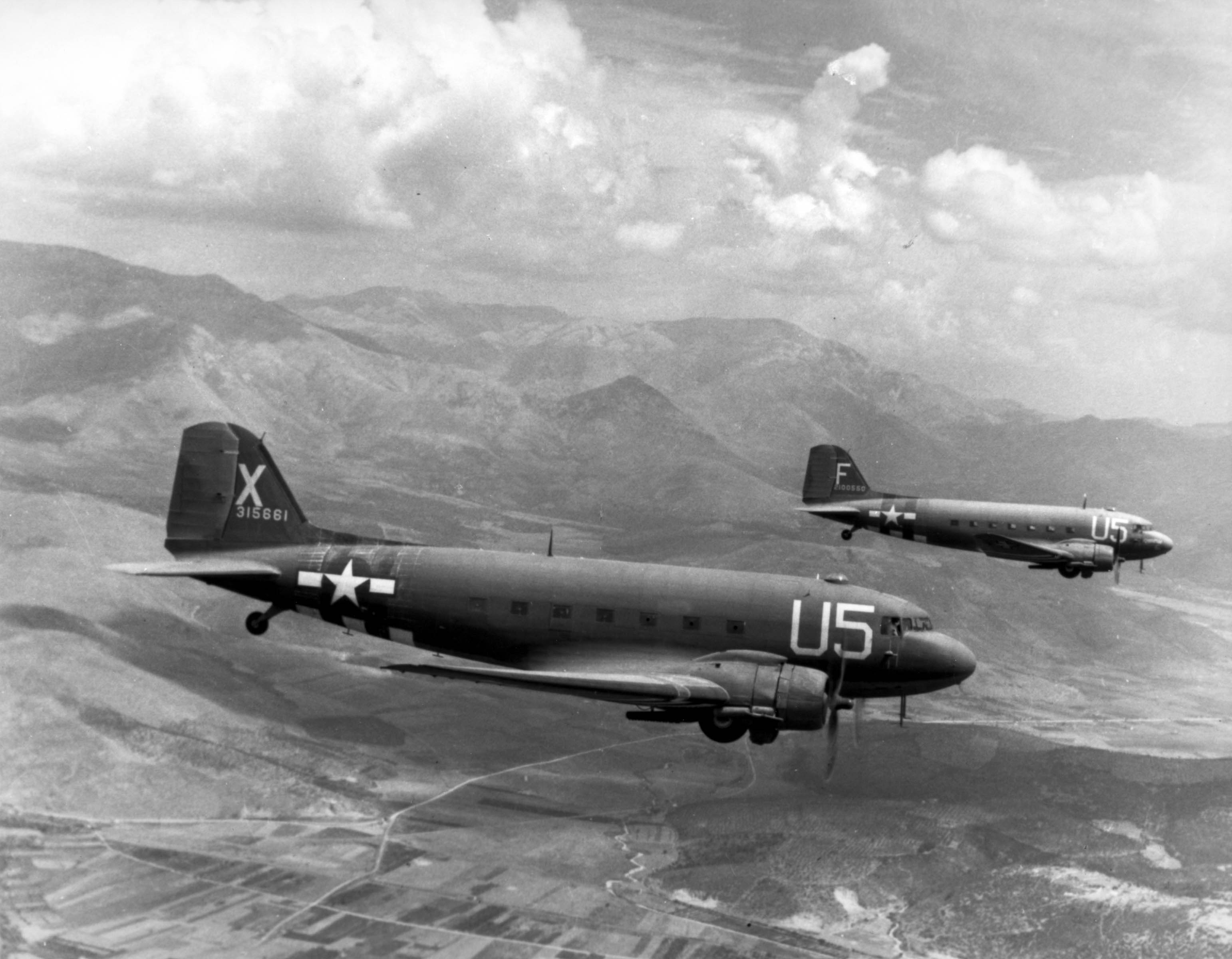
Paratroop carrying C-47s en route to the South of France for Operation Dragoon

At 03:34 on 15 August 1944, the brigade's pathfinders from the 23rd Independent Parachute Platoon landed on Drop Zone 'O'. The brigade drop zone was in a valley 2 miles (3.2 km) long and around 1.5 miles (2.4 km) wide running north to south, bordered on the south by the River Naturby. Their primary objective, Le Muy, was only around 400 yards (370 m) from the southern edge of the drop zone, but they would have to cross the river to reach it.

By 04:30 the pathfinders had set up two Eureka beacons and landing lights to guide the transport planes to the correct drop zone. (Note: Eureka beacons had a maximum range of 42 miles (68 km), but their average range was only 24 miles (39 km).) When the main force of C-47 aircraft arrived around 04:45 only seventy-three dropped their parachutists on the correct drop zone. The other fifty-three aircraft scattered their loads, mostly from the 5th (Scottish) Parachute Battalion, over the countryside, some landing 20 miles (32 km) away at Cannes and Fayence. (Note: The lead plane carrying the 5th (Scottish) Parachute Battalion had an electrical failure and was unable to pick up the Eureka signals, and only 'B' Company landed on the correct drop zone.) Only Brigade Headquarters arrived at the drop zone in one piece, Brigadier Pritchard landing only 15 yards (14 m) from the Eureka beacons. The 4th Parachute Battalion had around forty per cent of its manpower and the 6th (Royal Welch) Parachute Battalion sixty per cent. By 06:30 Brigade Headquarters was established at Le Mitan and radio contact made with the American 36th Infantry Division, which at the time was still on their transports out at sea. On the drop zone the pathfinders and Royal Engineers of the 2nd Parachute Squadron were removing obstacles, preparing for the arrival of their gliders later in the day, while the under strength parachute battalions headed for their objectives.

The 4th Parachute Battalion secured its first objectives, the high ground overlooking the village of Le Muy from the north and the village of Les Serres, by 04:30. However the men left defending the village had to fight off several small German counterattacks throughout the day. The battalion then assaulted and captured the bridge over the River Naturby, which carried the road to Le Muy, taking twenty-nine prisoners. The fighting cost the battalion seven dead and nine wounded.

Most of the 5th (Scottish) Parachute Battalion landed in several groups, some distance from their drop zone. One large group comprised the commanding officer, most of the battalion headquarters and 'C' Company. A second group was formed by 'D' Company. Twenty-one men, including the battalion intelligence officer, formed a third smaller group. The first group divided into three smaller units, all of which arrived at brigade headquarters by 22:30 on the same day.

The second group occupied the village of Tourettes, and soon after attacked a German convoy, damaging several vehicles and causing heavy casualties among the occupants. Then they met with the 3rd Battalion of the 517th Parachute Infantry Regiment and both units headed south towards Le Muy.

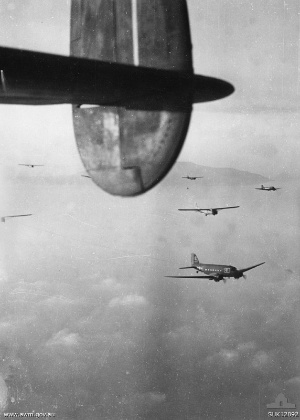
British Gliders towed by C47s over Southern France

One result of the brigades' scattered landing was that several small groups of men caused havoc among the Germans, ambushing men and vehicles. One lone sergeant arrived at brigade headquarters with eighty prisoners, having convinced them that they were surrounded and should surrender. The 5th (Scottish) Parachute Battalion's 'B' Company, which had landed on the correct drop zone, ambushed a convoy of five trucks, killing twelve Germans, then assaulted a château, killing another thirty men before the surviving fifty surrendered.

The 6th (Royal Welch) Parachute Battalion lost some men to German fire as they descended and, once on the ground, had to fight their way to the battalion rendezvous. Then they headed for their first objectives, capturing La Motte, which became the first village liberated in the South of France. By 12:00, they had taken all of their objectives, capturing over 100 prisoners.

The first of the brigade's glider units, forty Waco gliders carrying the 64th Airlanding Light Battery Royal Artillery and their 75 mm pack howitzers, landed at 09:20. The thirty-five larger Horsa gliders, transporting the 300th Airlanding Anti-Tank Battery and its equipment, failed to arrive, turning back to Italy due to an overcast sky at the landing zone. The Horsas returned with the afternoon's second wave landing at 15:04.

By 22:15 the brigade had secured all of its day-one objectives and some of the missing men had arrived in the brigade area. However, there were many still unaccounted for. The 4th Parachute Battalion numbered around 200 men with almost no heavy weapons. The 6th (Royal Welch) Parachute Battalion had 317 men. There were only enough men of the 5th (Scottish) Parachute Battalion to guard the approach roads leading to the drop zone from the north.

=== Link up with seaborne landings ===
The scattered nature of the airborne landings caused some confusion among the German high command. At the LXII Corps headquarters, several reports of the landings exaggerated their strength, causing the Germans to believe they were faced with a far greater force. Also, 600 dummy paratroops that had landed to the north and west of Toulon, as part of the Allied deception plan, convinced the Germans another landing had taken place there.

The 2nd Parachute Brigade had a secondary objective of capturing Le Muy. It was supposed to have been assaulted by the 4th Parachute Battalion with the 5th (Scottish) Parachute Battalion providing fire support. With the forces he had at hand, Pritchard was unable to carry out the task. (Note: Pritchard had also been ordered by the commander of the 15th Army Group General Harold Alexander to keep his casualties to a minimum, as the brigade was needed for another parachute mission in Greece (Operation Manna) soon afterwards.) The objective was then given to the 550th Glider Infantry Battalion, which had arrived with the second wave of aircraft. At 02:15 16 August the American battalion moved through the British positions and assaulted the village. The village was defended in strength by the Germans and the attack failed, causing several casualties to the Americans. A second attempt at 11:40 was more successful, killing or wounding 300 Germans and taking 700 prisoners.

Further north, the missing men of the 5th (Scottish) Parachute Battalion were still trying to reach the brigade area. The smaller group commanded by the battalion intelligence officer observed a German convoy heading south towards Le Muy. They quickly set up an ambush and destroyed several vehicles before being forced to withdraw into the hills by the stronger German force.

On 17 August the leading units of the 36th Infantry Division reached Le Muy, which should have effectively ended the brigade's participation in the operation; however, two of the brigade's companies defending roads in the area were attacked by retreating Germans and forced to withdraw to the high ground. The brigade sent reinforcements which successfully counterattacked the Germans, taking ninety-seven prisoners.

Early on 18 August the brigade elements to the north-east of Le Muy were relieved by the 36th Infantry Division, and the brigade became the Operation Dragoon reserve formation. Then problems on the far right of the landings between Grasse and Cannes resulted in the brigade being sent to that area. Having no transport other than a small number of Jeeps, mostly to tow their artillery guns, the brigade commandeered several trucks, tractors, buses and horse-drawn wagons and was in place within twenty-four hours. Cannes was liberated on 25 August. On the next day, the brigade left France to return to Italy.

== Aftermath ==
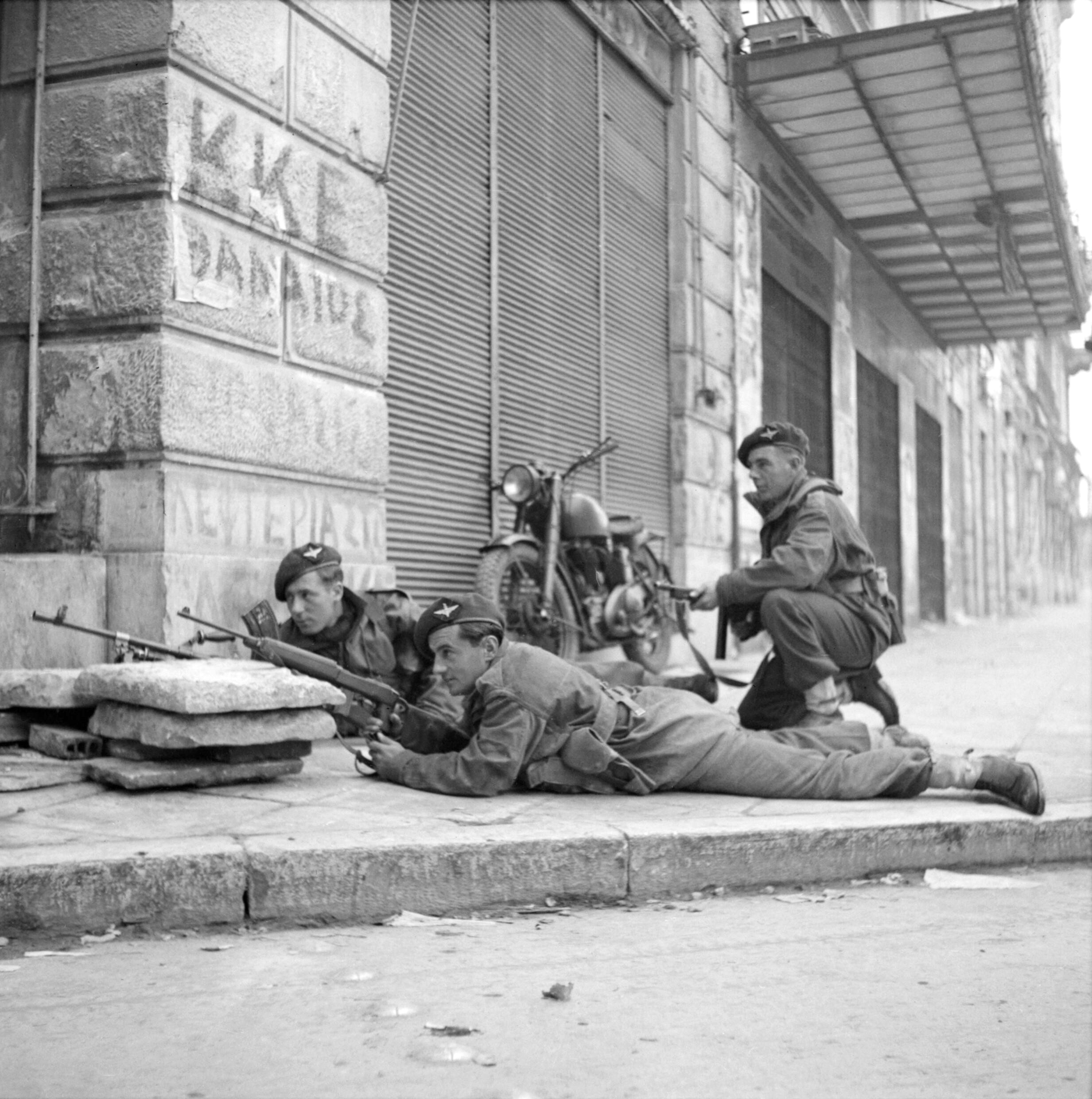
Men of the 5th (Scottish) Parachute Battalion in Athens, December 1944

The 2nd Parachute Brigade arrived by sea at Naples on 28 August. From there they moved to Rome on 3 September, and on 8 September, to a camp near Taranto in preparation for their next mission. During Operation Rugby the 2nd Parachute Brigade recorded 362 casualties; 51 dead, 130 wounded and 181 missing. Most of the missing eventually returned to the brigade and only 126 replacements were required to bring the brigade back up to strength.

The brigade's next mission was Operation Manna. This time they would be landing in Greece. The Soviet Red Army advance in the east had forced the Germans to withdraw from the country or risk being cut off from any support or reinforcements. Over the night of 12/13 October 1944, the first of the brigade's units parachuted onto Megara airfield near Athens to prepare a landing zone for the follow-up waves from the rest of the brigade. The brigade moved into Athens and then over three months fought their way to Salonika and the border with Bulgaria.

When the brigade left the 1st Airborne Task Force, the 1st Special Service Force replaced them. The task force advanced eastwards and reached the Franco-Italian border in the Menton area and the French Alps along part of what was the Maginot Line. Here they halted in a defensive position for three months before being pulled out. The task force was now surplus to requirements and was disbanded on 23 November 1944. Its surviving manpower was used as reinforcements for the other American airborne formations.

== Brigade order of battle ==
- Brigade headquarters
- 4th Parachute Battalion
- 5th (Scottish) Parachute Battalion
- 6th (Royal Welch) Parachute Battalion
- 127th (Parachute) Field Ambulance
- 64th Airlanding Light Battery Royal Artillery
- 300th Airlanding Anti-Tank Battery Royal Artillery
- 2nd Parachute Squadron Royal Engineers
- 751st Parachute Brigade Company Royal Army Service Corps
- 2nd Parachute Brigade Group Workshop Royal Electrical and Mechanical Engineers
- 2nd Parachute Brigade Group Signals Royal Corps of Signals
- 1st Independent Glider Pilot Squadron Army Air Corps
- 23rd Independent Parachute Platoon

== Notes ==
Footnotes

Citations
