= 6th (Royal Welch) Parachute Battalion =

- Cap badge of the Parachute Regiment
- Active: 1942–1947
- Country: United Kingdom
- Branch: British Army
- Type: Infantry
- Role: Airborne forces
- Size: Battalion
- Part of: 2nd Parachute Brigade
- Nickname: Red Devils
- Mottos: Utrinque Paratus (Latin for "Ready for Anything")

Insignia
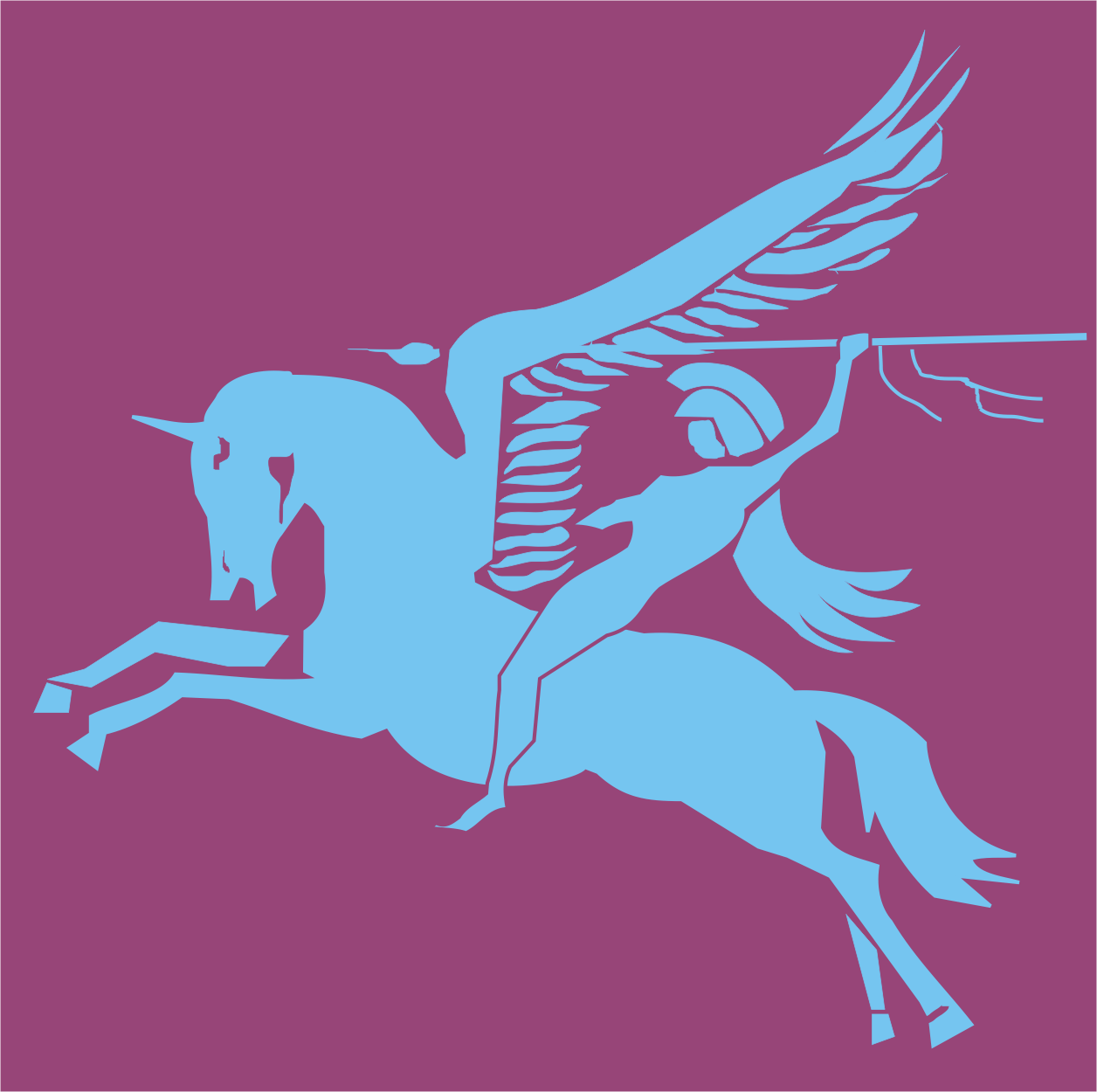
- Emblem of the British Airborne Forces

The 6th (Royal Welch) Parachute Battalion was an airborne infantry battalion of the Parachute Regiment raised by the British Army during the Second World War.

The battalion was created in 1942 by the conversion of the 10th (Merionethshire and Montgomeryshire) Battalion, Royal Welch Fusiliers to parachute duties. It was then assigned to the 2nd Parachute Brigade, at that time serving in the 1st Airborne Division in England.

The battalion's first combat action was in 1943, when it participated in an amphibious landing, Operation Slapstick, at the port of Taranto in Italy. When the 1st Airborne Division left Italy, the battalion, still with the 2nd Parachute Brigade, remained behind, where it took part in the Battle of Monte Cassino.

The battalion's first combat parachute jump was during Operation Dragoon the Allied invasion of the south of France. Soon after the invasion, the battalion returned to Italy and took part in a second combat parachute jump, Operation Manna in Greece.

After the Second World War the battalion became part of the 6th Airborne Division and served in Palestine. Post war reductions in the British Armed Forces resulted in the battalion being amalgamated with the 4th Parachute Battalion in 1947.

== Background ==
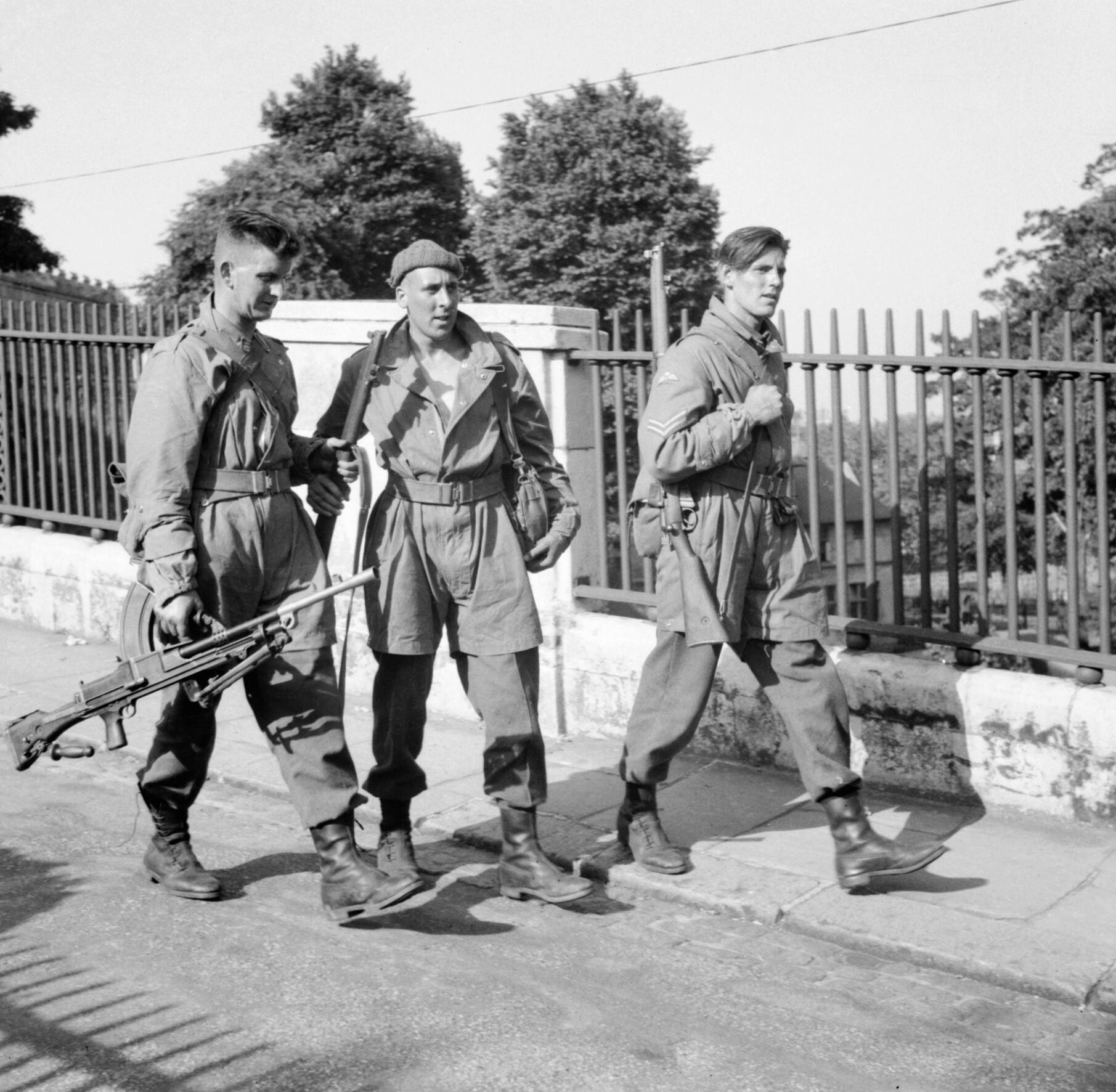
British paratroopers, in Norwich, during exercises, 23 June 1941.

Impressed by the success of German airborne operations during the Battle of France, the then British Prime Minister, Winston Churchill, directed the War Office to investigate the possibility of creating a corps of 5,000 parachute troops. The standards set for British airborne troops were extremely high, and from the first group of 3,500 volunteers only 500 men were accepted to go forward to parachute training.

Additionally, on 22 June 1940, a Commando unit, No. 2 Commando, was converted to parachute duties. On 21 November, it was re-designated the 11th Special Air Service Battalion (later becoming the 1st Parachute Battalion), with a parachute and glider wing. These men took part in the first British airborne operation, Operation Colossus, on 10 February 1941. The success of the raid prompted the War Office to expand the existing airborne force, setting up the Airborne Forces Depot and Battle School in Derbyshire in April 1942, and creating the Parachute Regiment. In August 1942, a number of infantry battalions were converted into airborne battalions. In most conversions, the majority of the original battalion either did not wish to become paratroopers, or failed medical or other tests. The spaces in the battalion were filled with volunteers from other units.

=== 6th (Royal Welch) Parachute Battalion ===
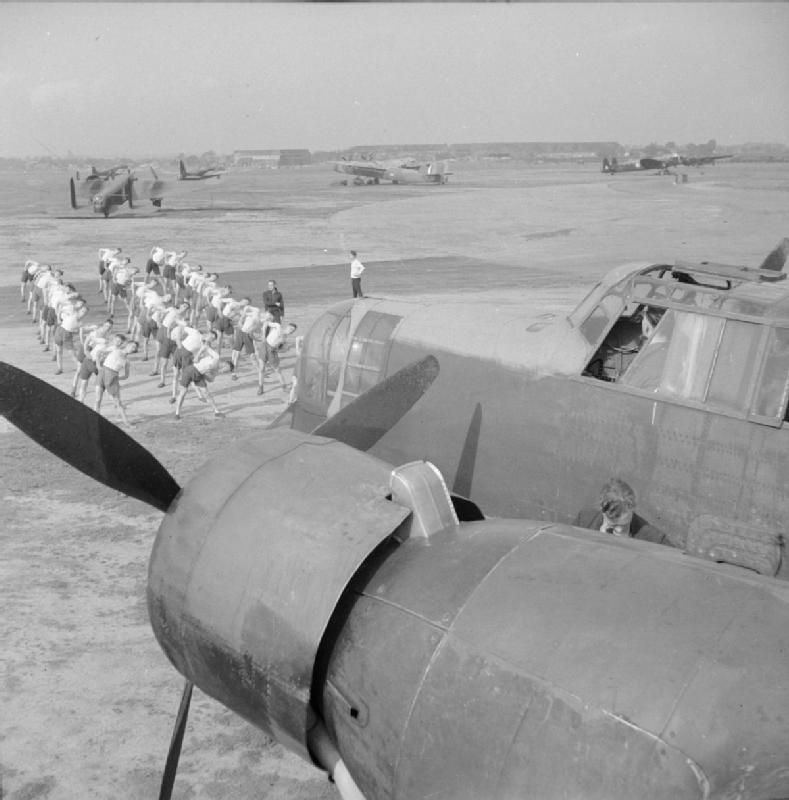
Men of the 6th (Royal Welch) Parachute Battalion undergoing physical training at RAF Ringway, August 1942.

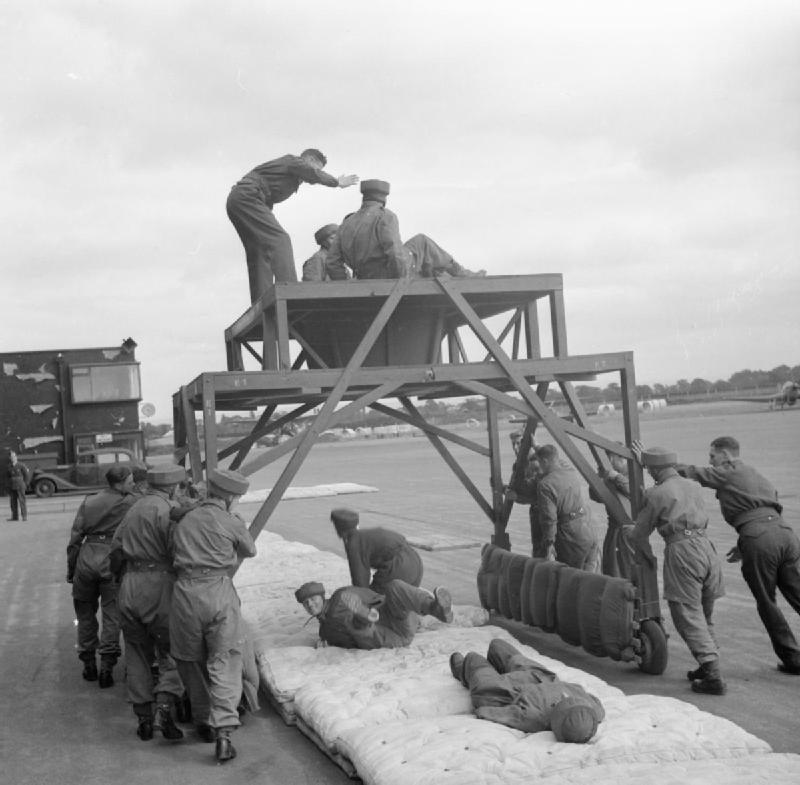
Recruits of the 6th (Royal Welch) Parachute Battalion being taught how to drop through a moving aperture, August 1942.

Under the command of Lieutenant Colonel Charles Hilary Vaughan Pritchard, the 10th (Merionethshire and Montgomeryshire) Battalion, Royal Welch Fusiliers was converted to the 6th (Royal Welch) Parachute Battalion in August 1942. It was then assigned to the newly raised 2nd Parachute Brigade, alongside the 4th and 5th Parachute Battalions. On formation, the battalion had an establishment of 556 men in three rifle companies. The companies were divided into a small headquarters and three platoons. The platoons had three Bren machine guns and three 2-inch mortars, one of each per section. The only heavy weapons in the battalion were a 3 inch mortar platoon and a Vickers machine gun platoon. By 1944 a headquarters or support company, was added to the battalion. This consisted of five platoons: motor transport, signals, mortar (with eight 3 inch mortars), machine-gun (with four Vickers machine guns) and anti-tank (with ten PIAT anti-tank projectors).

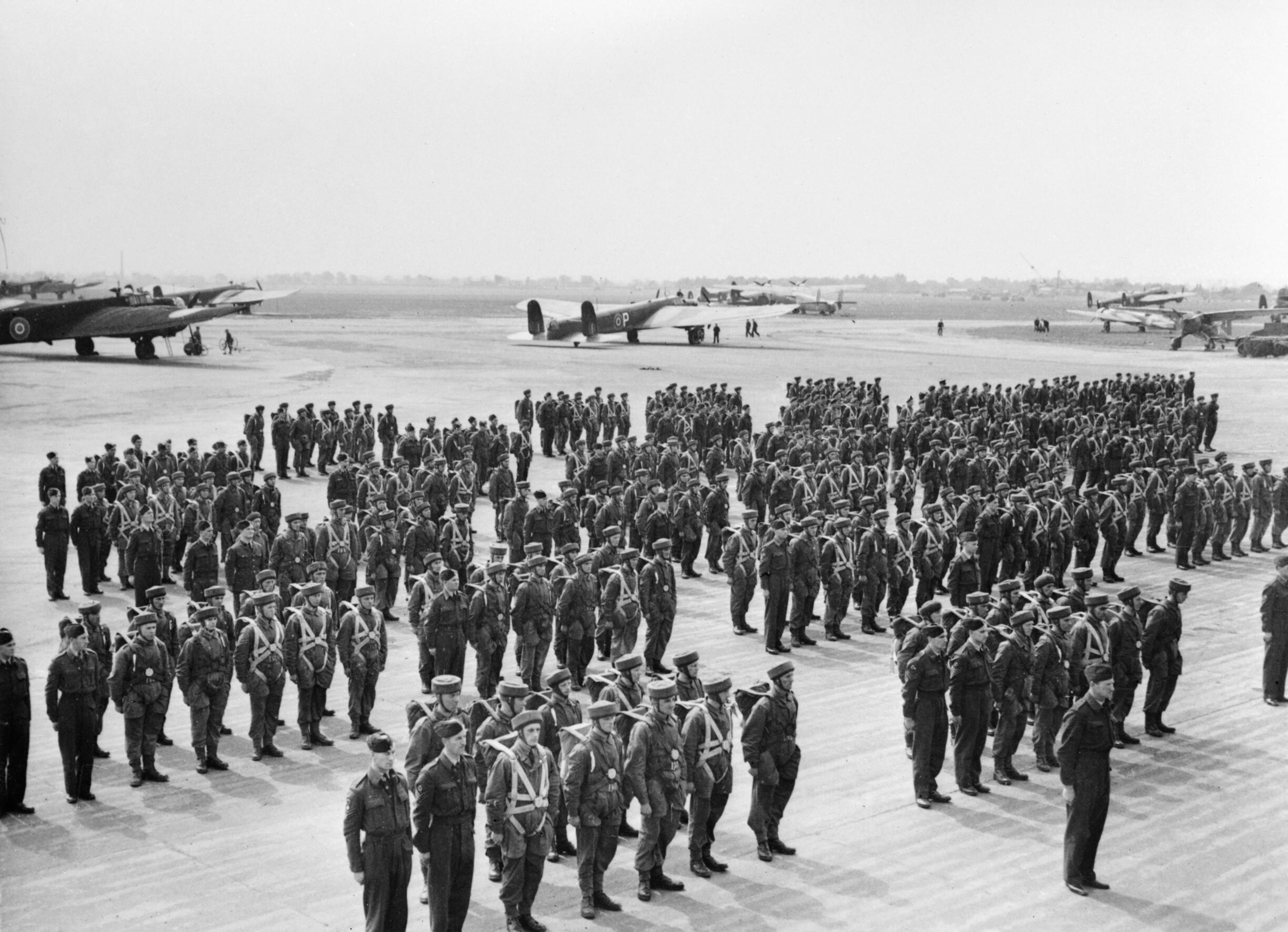
Men of the 6th (Royal Welch) Parachute Battalion on parade at the end of their parachute training.

All members of the battalion had to undergo a twelve-day parachute training course carried out at No. 1 Parachute Training School, RAF Ringway. The course began with parachute jumps from a converted barrage balloon and finished with five parachute jumps from an aircraft. (Note: Barrage balloons were used to speed up training jumps and meet the target of 5,000 trained parachutists.) Anyone failing to complete a descent was returned to his old unit. Those men who successfully completed the parachute course were presented with their maroon beret and parachute wings.

Airborne soldiers were expected to fight against superior numbers of the enemy armed with heavy weapons including artillery and tanks, so training was designed to encourage a spirit of self-discipline, self-reliance and aggressiveness. Emphasis was given to physical fitness, marksmanship and fieldcraft. A large part of the training regime consisted of assault courses and route marching. Military exercises included capturing and holding airborne bridgeheads, road or rail bridges and coastal fortifications. At the end of most exercises, the battalion would march back to their barracks. An ability to cover long distances at speed was expected: airborne platoons were required to cover a distance of 50 miles (80 km) in 24 hours, and battalions to cover 32 miles (51 km). (Note: This ability was demonstrated in April 1945. When the 3rd Parachute Brigade advanced 15 miles (24 km) in twenty-four hours, which included eighteen hours of close-quarters fighting. In the same month the 5th Parachute Brigade marched 50 miles (80 km) in seventy-two hours, during which they also carried out two night time assaults.)

== Operations ==
=== Italy ===
The 1st Airborne Division, now under Major General George Frederick "Hoppy" Hopkinson, including the 6th (Royal Welch) Parachute Battalion, was sent to Tunisia in 1943, to prepare for operations in Sicily and Italy. During the Allied invasion of Sicily plans were formed for three brigade-sized operations over successive days. The first British landing, Operation Ladbroke, was carried out by the 1st Airlanding Brigade (consisting of glider infantry) over the night of 9–10 July. The second operation should have been Operation Glutton, to be carried by the 2nd Parachute Brigade on the night of 10–11 July. It was intended that the brigade were to capture a bridge near Augusta, but circumstances changed and the operation was cancelled. The 1st Parachute Brigade were given the third mission Operation Fustian at Primosole Bridge on the night of 13–14 July.

Both the 1st Airlanding Brigade and 1st Parachute Brigade suffered heavy casualties in Sicily, so when it was proposed that the division take part in Operation Slapstick, only the 2nd Parachute Brigade and 4th Parachute Brigade were up to strength. Operation Slapstick was an amphibious landing at the port of Taranto on mainland Italy. The 2nd Parachute Brigade left Bizerta on 8 September, the day before the Italian surrender, and landed unopposed. The only casualties incurred during the operation were fifty-eight men from the 6th Parachute Battalion who drowned after their transport ship HMS Abdiel hit a mine in the harbour. While the 4th Parachute Brigade pushed inland the 2nd Brigade assumed responsibility for securing the port and surrounding area. During fighting around the town and airfield of Gioia del Colle the divisional commander, Major-General Hopkinson, was killed and replaced by Brigadier Ernest Down. Lieutenant-Colonel Pritchard was promoted to Brigadier and given command of the brigade. He was replaced as commanding officer of the 6th Parachute Battalion by Lieutenant-Colonel J. R. Goodwin.

The 1st Airborne Division was withdrawn to England soon after, The 2nd Parachute Brigade, which included the 6th Battalion, remained in Italy as an independent formation, initially under the command of the 2nd New Zealand Division. In June 1944, a small detachment of sixty men commanded by Captain Fitzroy-Smith took part in Operation Hasty, a parachute landing behind German lines near Trasacco. Their objective was to interdict supply lines and the movement of troops as they withdrew from Sora to Avezzano.

=== France ===
The 6th (Royal Welch) Parachute Battalion took part in its first combat parachute drop in Southern France from 04:40 on 15 August 1944. During the landing the brigade was badly dispersed, with only Brigade Headquarters landing intact. The 4th Parachute Battalion could muster between thirty and forty per cent of its strength. The 5th (Scottish) Parachute Battalion were in the worst shape with only around a company of men at the drop zone, while around seventy per cent of the 6th Parachute Battalion arrived safely.

The battalion then occupied La Motte and Clastron following the surrender of the German garrison. While the villages were being secured patrols were sent out to make contact with the American 517th Parachute Regimental Combat Team in the area of La Motte. By 16:00 more men from the battalion had arrived at the drop zone, and now numbered seventeen officers and 300 other ranks. The men of 'C' Company were sent out to patrol the road between Le Muy and Le Luc to ambush any retreating Germans, but returned to the drop zone at 22:00, without having come into contact with any Germans. The night of 15/16 August was quiet and a patrol sent to Le Muy returned with eleven German prisoners. Later that day an American battalion captured Lu Muy, and seventy Germans, with six anti-tank guns, surrendered to a four-man patrol from the battalion.

At 14:00 17 August two platoons from the battalion engaged Germans retreating from a small battle with the 5th Parachute Battalion, and by now the US 36th Infantry Division and US 45th Infantry Division had advanced from their beach head to link up with the airborne forces. By 20 August the battalion was in the Fréjus area, Cannes was liberated on 25 August and the 2nd Parachute Brigade sailed for Italy landing at Naples on 28 August.

=== Greece ===
The 2nd Parachute Brigade was warned for an operation in Greece, Operation Manna, to replace the retreating German Army and ensure law and order was maintained until a government could be formed. The advance party from the 4th Parachute Battalion landed on 12 October on Megara airfield 28 miles (45 km) from Athens. Adverse weather affected the drop and caused a number of casualties, and prevented the remainder of the brigade landing. Plans were formed for a surgical team to travel by glider the next day to support the 4th Battalion's medical officer on the airfield. By 14 October the weather had improved and the majority of the brigade, less the glider force, was able to parachute onto the airfield. High winds caused a number of casualties; from the 1,900 men taking part three were killed and ninety-seven wounded. The 4th and 6th Battalions then set out for Athens.

The brigade became responsible for policing Athens and keeping both sides in the growing Greek Civil War apart. Then on 4 November, the 6th Battalion moved to Thebes, while the 5th (Scottish) Parachute Battalion with brigade headquarters and 127th (Parachute) Field Ambulance moved to Salonika. It had been intended to withdraw the brigade but the situation deteriorated and they were sent back to Athens. The 2nd Parachute Brigade and 2nd Armoured Brigade moved into the city, holding the Acropolis of Athens and strategic junctions. In the sporadic fighting casualties were light but constant. The 6th Battalion had 130 casualties during the fighting in Greece.

=== Post-war ===
The battalion returned to Italy but did not see active service again. After the war they returned to England for a short time, before with the complete brigade joined the 6th Airborne Division serving in Palestine. In the post-war reduction in the British Army, in December 1947 the battalion was amalgamated with the 4th Parachute Battalion as the 4th/6th Parachute Battalion.

== Memorials ==
6th (Royal Welch) Parachute Bn has two memorials: a bronze plaque on the wall of St Mary's Church, Dolgellau, and a carved pew end in the Royal Garrison Church, Aldershot. Both feature a rampant Welsh dragon in addition to the Parachute Regiment cap badge.

== Notes ==
Footnotes

Citations

== External sources ==
- Imperial War Museum, War Memorials Register
