= Operation Hasty =

- Part of Italian Campaign (World War II)
- The Abruzzo region of Italy
Date	1–7 June 1944
Location	Abruzzo, Italy

Belligerents
United Kingdom	Germany

Commanders and leaders
Captain L.A. Fitzroy-Smith	

Units involved
Detachment from 2nd Parachute Brigade	10th Army

Strength
60 men	brigade

Casualties and losses
33 men	Unknown

Operation Hasty was a mission behind German lines in Italy, during the Second World War. The operation was carried out in June 1944, by a small force of 60 men drawn from the 2nd Independent Parachute Brigade.

Their objective was to land behind German positions in the Abruzzo region near Trasacco and interdict supply lines and the movement of troops as they withdrew from Sora to Avezzano. The operation had mixed fortunes; the Germans responded in force, using a brigade of troops to hunt down the parachutists, and a division was held in reserve instead of moving to the front. However, the British parachutists were attacked almost immediately upon landing and had to evade the German searchers. Little over a week later, when the mission ended, less than half the force returned safely to British lines.

== Background ==
The 1st Airborne Division landed in Italy in September 1943, during Operation Slapstick. By the end of the year the majority of the division had been withdrawn to England, for operations in Northern Europe. Leaving the 2nd Parachute Brigade behind as an independent formation. Without a dedicated air force transport aircraft formation, opportunities for parachute operations were limited and the brigade was used in a ground role as normal infantry, taking part in fighting in the Moro River Campaign and the Battle of Monte Cassino.

In May 1944, the brigade was withdrawn to a rest area near Salerno, and three officers and 57 men, were selected to carry out Operation Hasty. The mission was planned by the commander of the British Eighth Army Lieutenant-General Oliver Leese. The objective was to disrupt the Germans from carrying out the destruction of bridges, and other infrastructure as they withdrew from Sora to Avezzano in the Abruzzo region of Italy to the Pisa–Rimini section of the Gothic line. During the planning stage it had been originally intended to use a complete battalion for the mission, but Brigadier Pritchard in command of the brigade decided to use a smaller unit and at the same time attempt to convince the Germans a larger force was being deployed by dropping dummy parachutists. The smaller detachment commanded by Captain Fitzroy-Smith was drawn from the 6th (Royal Welch) Parachute Battalion, supported by medics from the 127th (Parachute) Field Ambulance and signallers from the Brigade Signals Company.

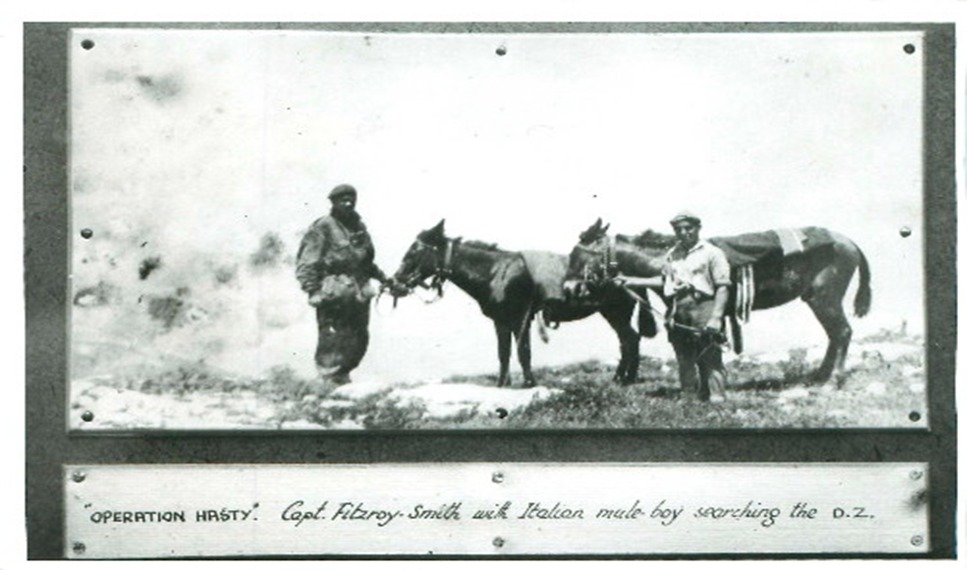
Captain Fitzroy-Smith and Ilari Luigi (nicknamed Mule Boy) searching the drop zone

== Mission ==
The 60 man detachment took off from Gaudo Airfield at 19:00 1 June 1944, in three Douglas Dakota aircraft accompanied by another eight aircraft carrying the dummy parachutists, belonging to the American 8th Airlift Squadron. The aircraft reached the drop zone near Trasacco by 20:30, and the landing was successful with only one injury, a man with a broken rib. At 21:00 the force had assembled at their rendezvous and radio contact was established with the 2nd New Zealand Infantry Division who were in overall command of the mission and arrangements made for the planned resupply parachute drops to go ahead. Fitzroy-Smith established a patrol base and the detachment was divided into three patrols each commanded by an officer.

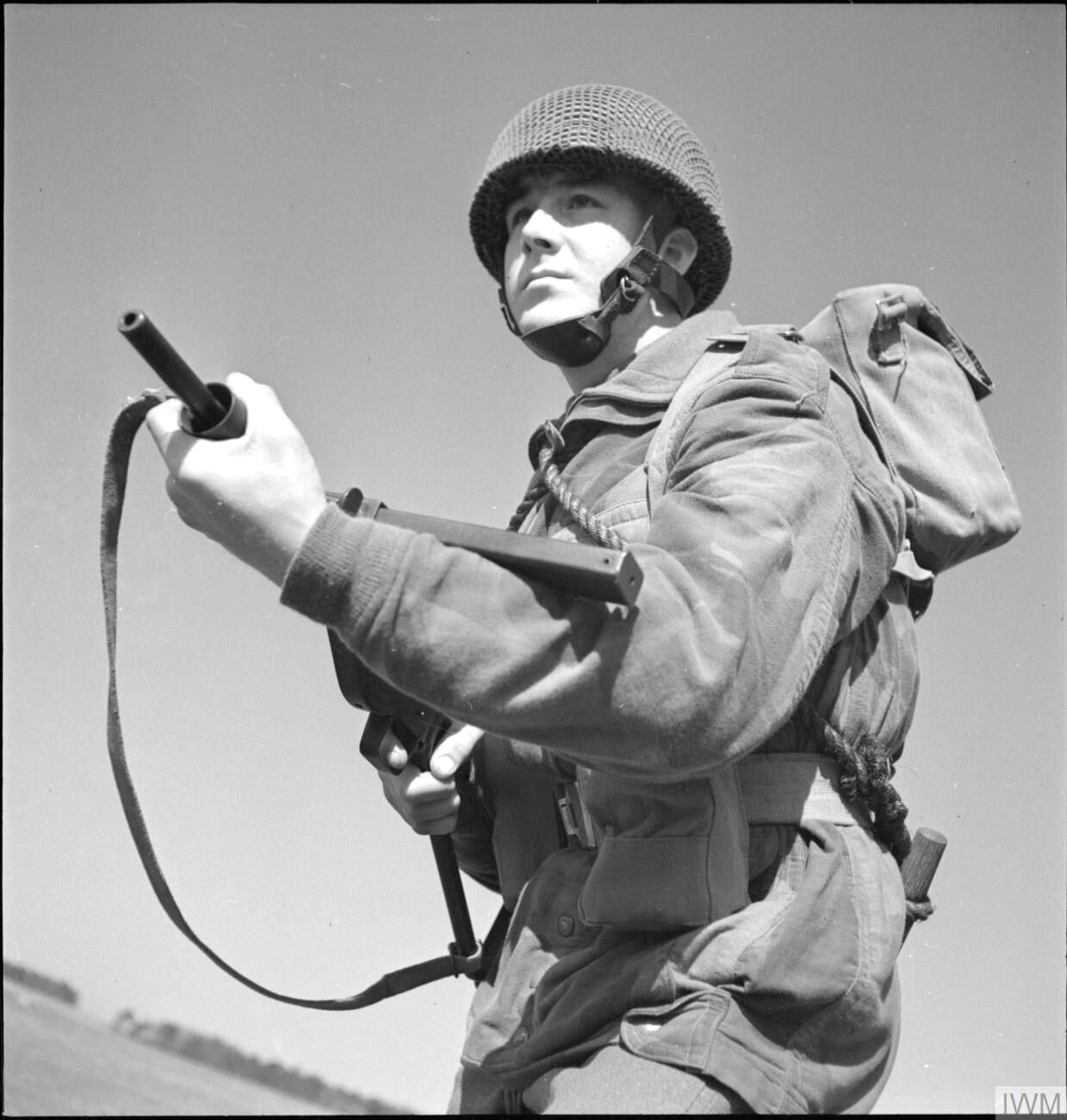
British Parachute Regiment soldier in 1943

German reaction to the landing was swift and their reconnaissance patrols were in the area within 20 minutes and the British base located and attacked within 24 hours. Avoiding a pitched battle the three patrols split up and for the next seven days disrupted German convoys and demolition parties. In response to the British presence a German brigade was detailed to locate the force and a division, held back in reserve instead of moving to reinforce the front line. During their search for the parachutists amongst other casualties, the Germans captured the detachments signallers and radio contact with the New Zealand division was lost when the detachments sole remaining radio was damaged.

By 7 June it was decided to withdraw the detachment, but with no radio working there was no way to pass on the decision. The 2nd Parachute Brigade commander, Brigadier Pritchard then came up with the idea of dropping leaflets around the area with the message "Proceed Awdry forthwith". The message meant little to the Germans, but the British knew that Captain Awdry was the 6th Parachute Battalion's liaison officer assigned to the 2nd New Zealand Division. The detachment then split up into smaller groups and attempted to make their own way back to the Allied lines.

== Aftermath ==
Of the 60 man detachment involved in Operation Hasty, only two officers and 25 men successfully returned to Allied lines. Little physical or material damage was caused to the Germans, but a small measure of success was the diversion of a brigade to hunt down 60 men and the loss of a division, retained behind the front line during the mission. The Germans succeeded in withdrawing to the Gothic line, and held the Allies there until mid September when following the Battle of Rimini, the city was captured.

Although Hasty was one of only two British airborne operations on mainland Italy during the war, the 2nd Parachute Brigade went on to carry out two bigger airborne operations, involving the whole brigade later the same year. In August they participated in Operation Dragoon the invasion of the South of France, and in October, Operation Manna in Greece.
