= 4th Battalion, Parachute Regiment =

- Cap badge of the Parachute Regiment
- Active: 1942 – present
- Country: United Kingdom
- Branch: British Army
- Type: Air assault infantry
- Role: Airborne forces
- Size: Battalion ≈559 personnel
- Part of: Parachute Regiment; 16 Air Assault Brigade
- Garrison/HQ: Leeds
- Nicknames: The Red Devils; The Paras; Fighting Forth
- Mottos: Utrinque Paratus (Latin for "Ready for Anything")
- March: Quick—Ride of the Valkyries; Slow—Pomp and Circumstance No 4
- Mascot: Shetland Pony (Pegasus)

Commanders
- Honorary Colonel: Lt.-Gen. Giles Hill, CB, CBE
- Notable commanders: General Anthony Farrar-Hockley GBE, KCB, DSO & Bar, MC

Insignia
- Drop zone flash

The 4th Battalion, Parachute Regiment (4 PARA), is an Army Reserve unit of the British Army. Now recruiting across the United Kingdom originally the Battalion covered the North of England, with its headquarters located in Pudsey, West Yorkshire. Following the Options for Change review in 1993, 4 PARA amalgamated with the 15th (Scottish) Battalion of the Parachute Regiment (XV PARA), which was downsized and became 15 (Scottish) Company of 4 PARA. As part of further changes in 1999 (Strategic Defence Review), the Battalion also merged with the 10th (Volunteer) Battalion which then became 10 (London) Company.

Under the Army 2020 plan, it formed a reserve air assault infantry battalion of 16 Air Assault Brigade.

== History ==
The original 4th Parachute Battalion was formed in 1942 and saw service in Algeria (as part of the British 1st Airborne Division during Operation Torch) and Tunisia (supporting American forces). In 1943 Operation Avalanche (Invasion of Italy) was launched and the Battalion was in action at Taranto and Cassino. In August 1944, the battalion was part of Operation Rugby in Southern France. In October 1944 the Battalion seized by airborne assault (Operation Manna) the airfield at Megara near Athens in Greece as part of the 2nd Independent Parachute Brigade. The battalion spent the rest of the war supporting the 2nd New Zealand Division. Then from 1945 served with the 6th Airborne Division in Palestine.

The present day Battalion is the successor to several T.A. Parachute Battalions which were all raised in 1947, although these units were raised during the Second World War either as parachute troops or infantry. These are:

10 Para Battalion (V) DZ Flash

- The 10th Parachute Battalion was a war-formed unit which as part of the British 1st Airborne Division fought at the Battle of Arnhem (Operation Market Garden). During this action Captain Lionel Ernest Queripel was awarded a posthumous Victoria Cross.
- The 12th (Yorkshire) Parachute Battalion and 13th (Lancashire) Parachute Battalion were based on war formed infantry battalions, the 10th Battalion Green Howards and the 2/4th South Lancashire Regiment respectively. Both were dropped in Normandy as part of the 6th Airborne Division during the 'D' Day landings (Operation Tonga) and on 12 June took part in the action at Breville. In 1945 both battalions took part in Operation Varsity (the Rhine Crossing) with the 6th Airborne Division.
- The 15th Parachute Battalion was originally raised in 1945 from the 1st battalion King's Regiment (Liverpool). Disbanded at the end of the war it was re raised as art of the T.A. 1947 as the 15th (Scottish) Parachute Battalion with its HQ in Glasgow.
- The 17th (Durham Light Infantry) Parachute Battalion was raised in 1947 in North East England by converting the 9th Battalion, Durham Light Infantry.

All of the TA Parachute Battalions formed part of the 44th Parachute Brigade (V) in 1956. While in this brigade, 12th/13th (Yorkshire and Lancashire) Battalion and the 17th (9 DLI) Battalions of the Parachute Regiment were amalgamated to form the 4th Battalion, Parachute Regiment in 1967.

Members of the battalion have since been deployed on various occasions to Afghanistan (Operation Herrick) and Iraq (Operation Telic). In 2024, the regiment is due to deploy to Cyprus as part of operation Operation Tosca.

== Structure ==
The battalion is organised as follows:

=== A Company (Scotland) ===
- Finnieston, Glasgow
- Lanark Road, Edinburgh

=== B Company (Greater London) ===
- Romford, London
- White City, London
- Croydon, London

=== C Company (North of England) ===
- Pudsey, Leeds
- Hebburn, Tyne & Wear
- Altcar Training Camp, Merseyside

=== D Company (Midlands) ===
- Lenton, Nottingham
- Rugby, Warwickshire
- Newport, Monmouthshire

== Notable personnel ==
- Lewis Collins, actor, served with 10 PARA.
- Richard Dunn, boxer, served with 4 PARA.
- Tim Healy, actor, served with 4 PARA.

== See also ==
- 1st Battalion, Parachute Regiment
- 2nd Battalion, Parachute Regiment
- 3rd Battalion, Parachute Regiment
- List of Second World War British airborne battalions
