= 5th (Scottish) Parachute Battalion =

- Cap badge of the Parachute Regiment
- Active: 1942–1948
- Country: United Kingdom
- Branch: British Army
- Type: Airborne forces
- Role: Parachute infantry
- Size: Battalion
- Part of: 2nd Parachute Brigade
- Nickname: Red Devils
- Mottos: Utrinque Paratus (Latin for "Ready for Anything")

Commanders
- Notable commanders: Jack Churchill

Insignia
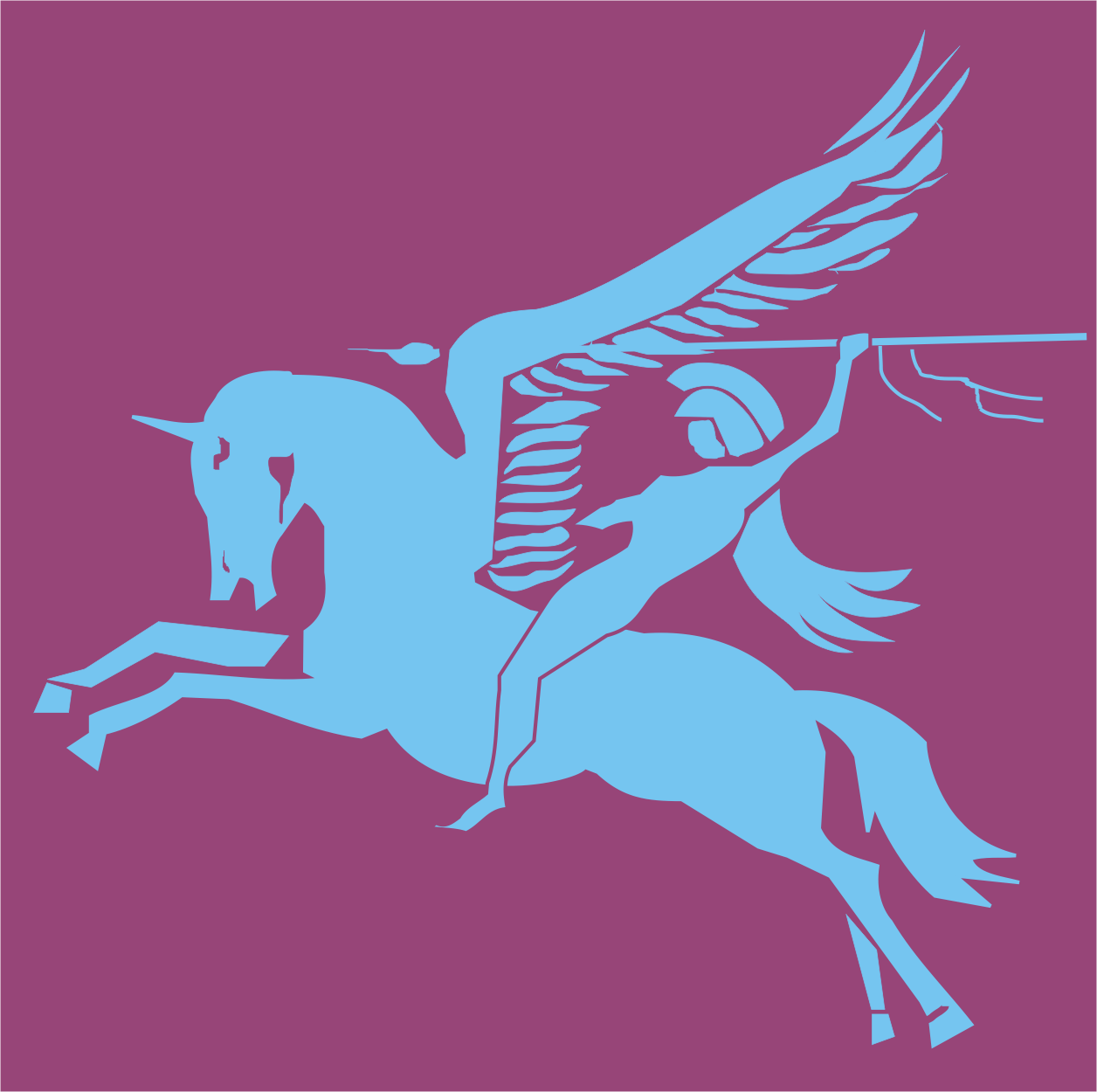
- The emblem of the Second World War British Airborne Forces, Bellerophon riding the flying horse Pegasus.

The 5th (Scottish) Parachute Battalion was an airborne infantry battalion of the Parachute Regiment, raised by the British Army during the Second World War.

The four proceeding British parachute infantry battalions had been raised by volunteers from all ranks of the army. The 5th (Scottish) Parachute Battalion was formed by the conversion of the 7th Battalion, Queen's Own Cameron Highlanders together with volunteers from other Scottish regiments for parachute duties. The 5th (Scottish) Parachute Battalion was assigned to the 2nd Parachute Brigade, which at the time, was part of the 1st Airborne Division.

The battalion fought in a number of actions in Italy, Greece and the south of France, where they carried out their only parachute assault of the war, during Operation Dragoon. At the end of the war, now attached to the 6th Airborne Division, the battalion was posted to Palestine, in an internal security role.

By 1948 the battalion was one of only three Regular Army parachute battalions remaining in the British Army. In June these battalions were renumbered and the 5th (Scottish) Parachute Battalion became the present day 2nd Battalion, Parachute Regiment.

== Formation history ==
=== Background ===
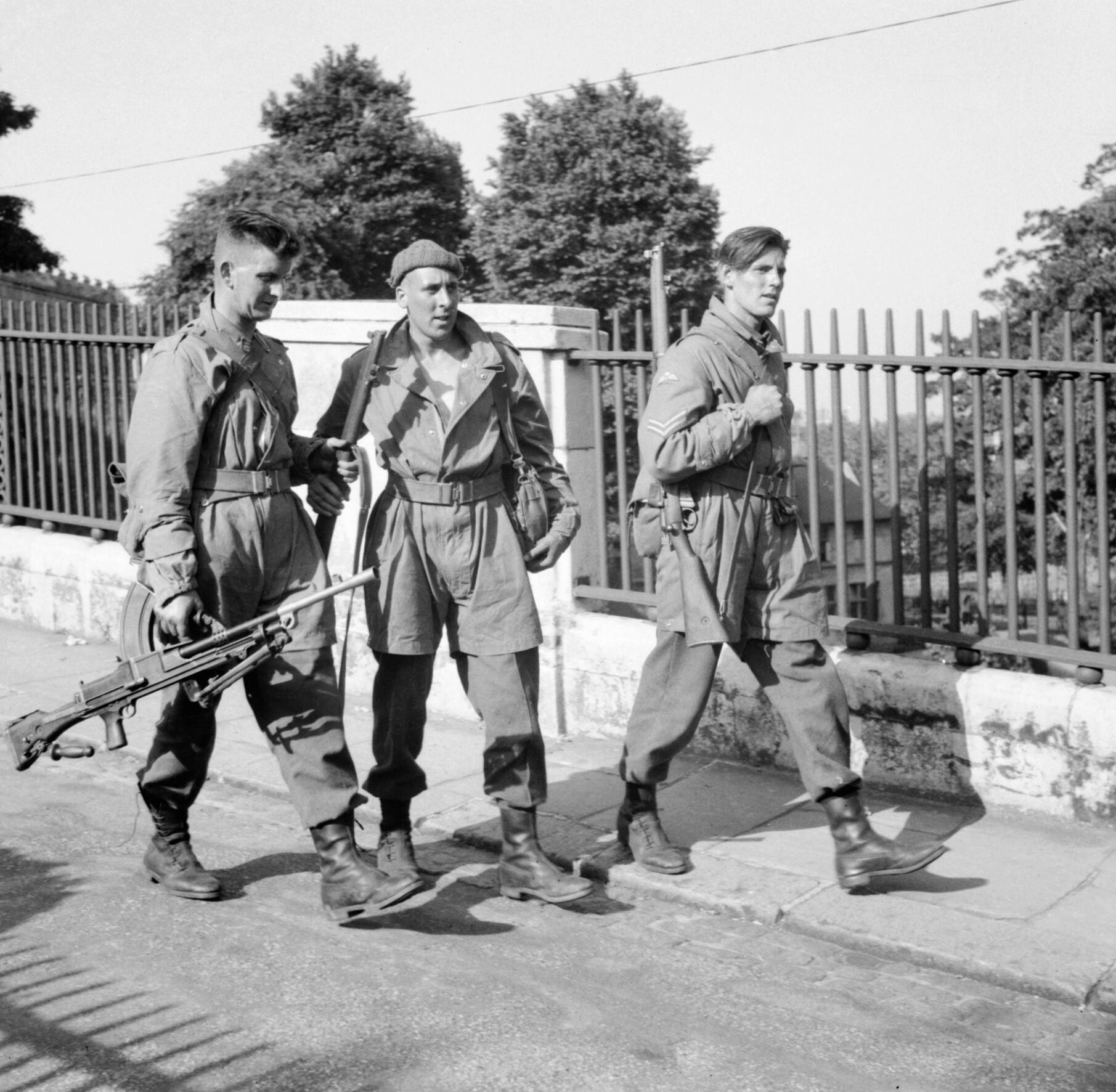
British paratroops wearing 'jump jackets', in Norwich during exercises, 23 June 1941

Impressed by the success of German airborne operations during the Battle of France, the then British Prime Minister, Winston Churchill, directed the War Office to investigate the possibility of creating a corps of 5,000 parachute troops. The standards set for British airborne troops were extremely high, and from the first group of 3,500 volunteers only 500 men were accepted to go forward to parachute training.

Additionally on 22 June 1940, a Commando unit, No. 2 Commando was turned over to parachute duties and on 21 November, re-designated the 11th Special Air Service Battalion (later the 1st Parachute Battalion), with a parachute and glider wing. It was these men who took part in the first British airborne operation, Operation Colossus, on 10 February 1941. The success of the raid prompted the War Office to expand the existing airborne force, setting up the Airborne Forces Depot and Battle School in Derbyshire in April 1942, and creating the Parachute Regiment as well as converting a number of infantry battalions into airborne battalions in August 1942. (Note: In most conversions, the majority of the original battalion either did not wish to become paratroopers, failed medical or other tests. The spaces in the battalion were filled with volunteers from other units.)

=== Battalion ===
In 1942 the 7th Battalion, Queen's Own Cameron Highlanders was part of the 46th (Highland) Infantry Brigade, in the 15th (Scottish) Infantry Division. On 24 March 1942 they were redesignated as the 5th (Scottish) Parachute Battalion. Those men that were deemed unsuitable for parachute duties were transferred to other units and were replaced by volunteers from other Scottish regiments. The 5th (Scottish) Parachute Battalion became the second unit assigned to the fledgling 2nd Parachute Brigade, at the time part of the 1st Airborne Division.

Upon formation the battalion and had an establishment of 556 men in three rifle companies. The companies were divided into a small headquarters and three platoons. The platoons had three Bren machine guns and three 2-inch mortars, one of each per section. The only heavy weapons in the battalion were a 3 inch mortar and a Vickers machine gun platoon. By 1944 a headquarters, or support, company was added to the battalion. It comprised five platoons: motor transport, signals, mortar, machine-gun and anti-tank and was equipped with eight 3-inch (76 mm) mortars, four Vickers machine guns and ten PIAT anti-tank projectors.

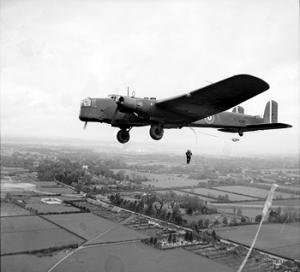
Parachute troops jumping from an Armstrong Whitworth Whitley near Windsor in England.

During training, all members of the battalion had to undergo a twelve-day parachute training course, which was carried out at No. 1 Parachute Training School, RAF Ringway. Initial training consisted of parachute jumps from a converted barrage balloon before progressing to five parachute jumps from an aircraft. (Note: Barrage balloons were used to speed up training jumps and meet the target of 5,000 trained parachutists.) Anyone failing to complete a descent was returned to his old unit. Those men who successfully completed the parachute course, were presented with their maroon beret and parachute wings. Initially the 5th Battalion wore a Balmoral bonnet instead of the beret, with the cap badge backed by a Hunting Stewart tartan patch.

Airborne soldiers were expected to fight against superior numbers of the enemy, armed with heavy weapons, including artillery and tanks. As a result, training was designed to encourage a spirit of self-discipline, self-reliance and aggressiveness. Emphasis was given to physical fitness, marksmanship and fieldcraft. A large part of the training regime consisted of assault courses and route marching. Military exercises included capturing and holding airborne bridgeheads, road or rail bridges and coastal fortifications. At the end of most exercises the battalion would march back to their barracks. An ability to cover long distances at speed was expected: airborne platoons were required to cover a distance of 50 miles (80 km) in 24 hours, and battalions 32 miles (51 km). (Note: This ability was demonstrated in April 1945 when the 3rd Parachute Brigade advanced 15 miles (24 km) in twenty-four hours, which included eighteen hours of close-quarters fighting. In the same month the 5th Parachute Brigade marched 50 miles (80 km) in seventy-two hours, during which they also carried out two night time assaults.)

== Operational history ==
=== Italy ===
The 5th (Scottish) Parachute Battalion, as part of the 2nd Parachute Brigade, did not see any combat until 1943, when they were sent to the Mediterranean. The war in North Africa was over and it was planned to parachute the battalion into Sicily during the invasion. However, a shortage of transport aircraft and then the speed of the Allied advance, made their deployment unnecessary.

On 9 July 1943 the battalion took part in Operation Slapstick as part a diversionary landing at the Italian port of Taranto. The battalion was the last unit of the brigade to land but quickly seized their objective, a small town 12 miles (19 km) to the east of Taranto.

In November the 1st Airborne Division was withdrawn to England, leaving the 2nd Parachute Brigade behind now as independent formation. Attached to the 2nd New Zealand Division, the battalion was involved in the Battle of Monte Cassino, the battles along the River Sangro and in the Salora region. The battalion, along with the rest of the 2nd Parachute Brigade, were then paraded for the Pope in Rome, and carried out training in the Naples area in preparation for the invasion of the south of France.

=== France ===
Around 04:40 on 15 August the battalion landed in the south of France. As a result of adverse weather conditions many of the transport aircraft were off course and instead of landing on the selected drop zone (DZ) they were scattered over a wide area of the countryside. Only one company from the battalion had actually landed on the correct DZ; most of the remainder were in the Fayence area. Unable to head for their objectives, the company moved to Le Mitan to defend brigade headquarters. At the same time they sent out patrols on the roads leading north and south of the DZ.

Three groups of the battalion had landed to the north of the correct DZ. One group contained the commanding officer, half of battalion headquarters and most of 'C' Company. The second group was composed of 'D' Company and some American parachutists. The third group had two officers and twenty men. The first group divided into three smaller groups headed for brigade headquarters, the last of them arriving at 22:30.

The second group to the north east of Fayence headed towards the DZ, and had reached Tourettes village when they heard firing. Believing the Germans had occupied the village, the group sent a reconnaissance patrol out to establish the German positions. They discovered Tourettes was clear of Germans but Fayence had been occupied. Informed by the local Maquis about some wounded paratroopers nearby, they organised a stretcher party to bring them into the village where they were treated in the Maquis hospital. At 13:30 the French took over the defence of the village and the second group left for Le Muy.

Just after leaving the group observed a German convoy of fifteen vehicles approaching and set up an ambush. However, the convoy was attacked before they reached the ambush by a mixed group of twenty-five British and American paratroopers. The second group meanwhile had been joined by sixty American paratroopers and together both groups attacked the now stranded convoy. Their attack killed eight and wounded four Germans and destroyed several vehicles. Some hours later they joined, another group of Americans from the 3rd Battalion 517th Parachute Infantry Regiment.

The third group had landed 2 miles (3.2 km) north east of Fayence, heading towards the DZ, they did not contact any German forces, but the number of injured from the parachute landing hindered progress. At 11:00 another platoon from the battalion joined the group and they moved around to the west of Fayence, where they stopped for the night.

The members of the battalion at the DZ established a strong position on the road heading north. The next day the two groups continued to make their way south from Frayence. The second group from 'D' Company, now 115 strong arrived at the battalion position unhindered. The third group attacked a convoy of fifteen vehicles, but while the attack was in progress, a large German force was seen approaching and the smaller battalion group was forced to withdraw. During the small battle eight vehicles had been destroyed, two staff cars and a truck captured. Seven Germans had been killed and seven taken prisoner.

The next day small detachments from the battalion were sent out and ambushed the withdrawing Germans. Both 'B' and 'C' Companies were in contact with the Germans at Quatres Chemins. At dawn the next day 'B' Company captured ten German officers and eighty-seven men. The battalion then moved into a brigade position at Le Muy, the brigade now becoming the army reserve. Cannes had been liberated on 25 August and on 26 August the brigade sailed for Naples arriving two days later.

=== Greece ===
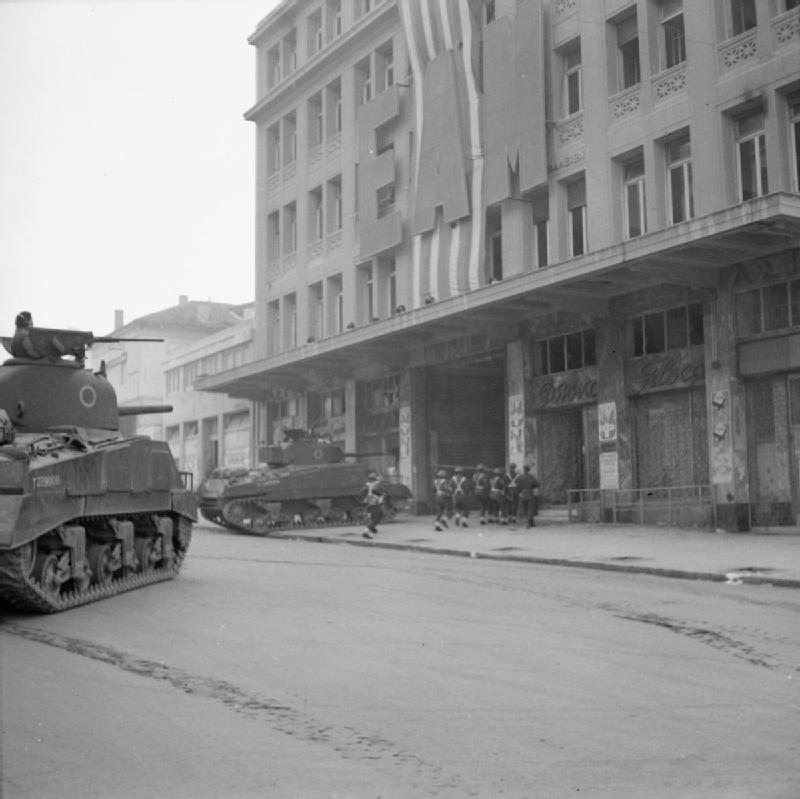
Sherman tanks and troops from the 5th (Scottish) Parachute Battalion, 2nd Parachute Brigade, during operations against members of ELAS in Athens, Greece, 6 December 1944.

In October 1944, the battalion was part of Operation Manna: a British force sent to secure the Greek capital of Athens following the German withdrawal from the Balkans. The battalion landed at Megara airfield, 40 miles (64 km) from Athens. The battalion first moved on Athens and then, following up the retreating German forces, took part in an amphibious landing at Salonika in November.

In December 1944, fighting broke out in Athens between the British-backed Greek government and the country's communist-led resistance movement, EAM-ELAS. The 2nd Parachute Brigade returned to the capital and became involved in intense street fighting against EAM-ELAS in December and early January 1945. During this time the battalion suffered over 100 casualties.

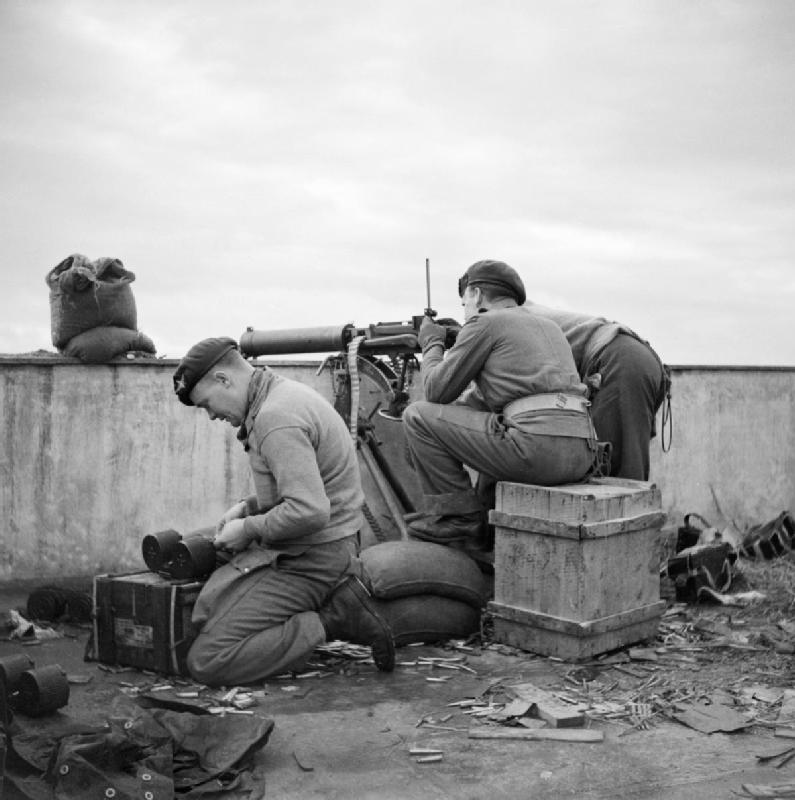
Paratroops from the 5th (Scottish) Parachute Battalion fire a Vickers machine gun from a rooftop in Athens, Greece during operations against members of ELAS, 7 December 1944.

On 1 February 1945 the 2nd Independent Parachute Brigade returned to Italy where it remained until the end of the war.

=== Palestine ===
At the end of the war the battalion had returned to England, and the brigade was assigned to the 6th Airborne Division, now the imperial strategic reserve. Unrest in the British mandate of Palestine, required an increase of troops and the division was sent to the area in an internal security role. On 25 April 1946 the battalion was involved in an incident where seven men guarding a car park in Tel Aviv were murdered by members of the Stern Gang.

In February 1948 the 2nd Parachute Brigade left the 6th Airborne Division and moved to Germany where it became part of the British Army on the Rhine. The 6th Airborne Division was disbanded soon afterwards, leaving the 2nd Parachute Brigade as the only airborne formation in the British Army. In June the 5th (Scottish) Parachute Battalion was renumbered as the 2nd Battalion, Parachute Regiment.

== Notes ==
Footnotes

Citations
