= Operation Manna =

1944 military operation in Greece

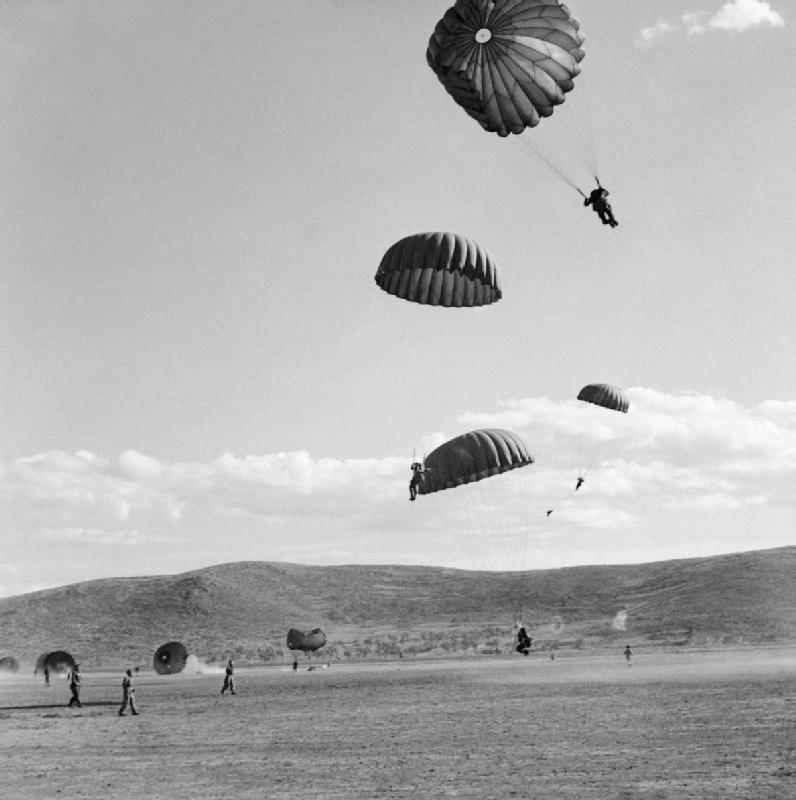
- British airborne troops of 'C' Company of the 4th Parachute Battalion descending on Megara in Greece, 12 October 1944
Date	October 1944
Location	Greece

Belligerents
United Kingdom; Greece	Germany

Operation Manna was the codeword for a Second World War operation by the British and Greek forces in Greece in mid-October 1944, following the gradual withdrawal of the German occupying forces from the country. The operation included an airborne element, which was conducted by the British 2nd Independent Parachute Brigade on 12 October, when elements of the 4th Parachute Battalion parachuted onto the Megara airfield 28 miles (45 km) outside of Athens. The prevailing weather conditions forced the abandonment of further parachute operations and it was not until 14 October that the rest of the brigade, less the 5th Parachute Battalion, arrived. After landing, the 4th and 6th Parachute Battalions marched on Athens. On 16 October, the 5th Battalion and the brigade's glider-borne element arrived. The 2nd Para Brigade was reinforced by the British 23rd Armoured Brigade, and the British force took over the protection of the city. The British and Free Greek navies transported British and Greek troops, as well as the Greek government in exile, to Athens.

== Background ==
=== The last months of the war ===
In September 1944, the withdrawal of German troops from Greece began. Wherever possible, ELAS units struck the retreating German troops. However, as historian T. Gerozisis writes, there was at least a "strange" phenomenon. The German army was leaving Greece, but the British air force and navy, dominant in the air and at sea, offered no resistance to the Germans. Gerozisis writes of a unique "agreement" between the British and Germans during the war. Albert Speer confirms that in the summer of 1944 the Germans and British came to an unsigned "Gentlemen's Agreement" in Lisbon.

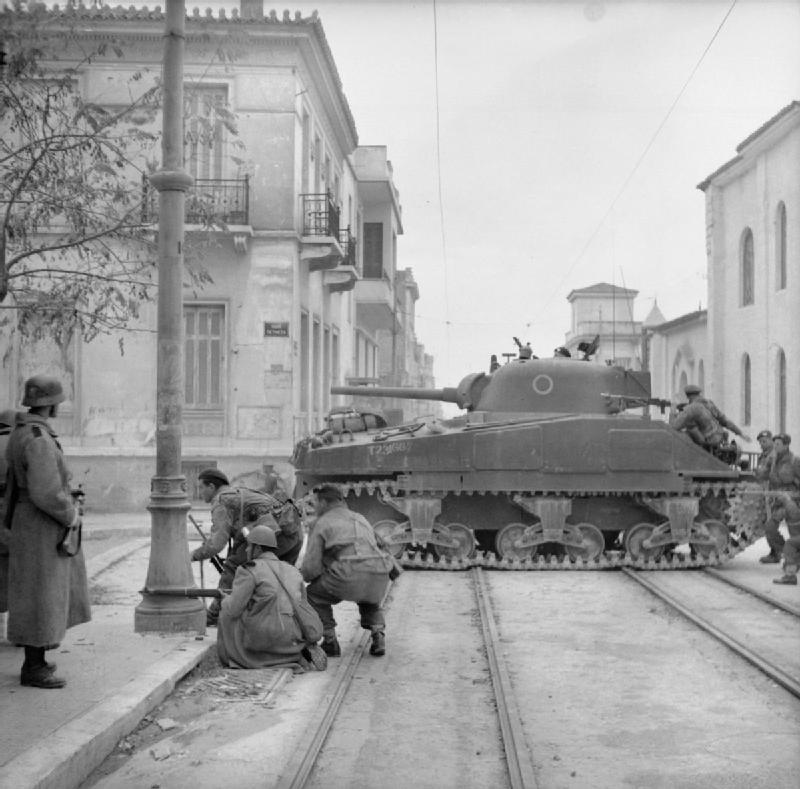
Sherman tanks and troops from 5th (Scots) Parachute Battalion, 2nd Parachute Brigade, during operations against members of ELAS in Athens, Greece.

The British were not to prevent the Germans from evacuating. In turn, the Germans were to hand over a number of Greek cities and positions to the British. "German troop transports from the Greek islands passed unimpeded under the eyes of the British and British U-boats in the Aegean and Mediterranean Seas in the autumn of 1944." German planes carried 50,000 troops from Crete and 17,000 troops from Rhodes unimpeded. This provoked protests from the Soviet commanders. British General Scobie negotiated the handing over of Greek cities to him to prevent their occupation by ELAS forces. Churchill himself wrote to Eden on 13 September: "there is a widespread belief in headquarters that we shall soon be fighting a bear and that we are in a better position to do so today than we were two months earlier".

=== Patras ===
Patras was one of the few, if not the only, city in Greece where the British supported the ELAS guerrillas in salvaging the infrastructure, especially the port, due to the importance of this "western gateway" of the country for further British plans. Even before Churchill's trip to Moscow and before the organisation of Operation Manna, a group of British Special Boat Service landed at the coastal airstrip of Araxos, near Patras.
