= 1st Airborne Division (United Kingdom) =

Airborne infantry division of the British Army during WWII

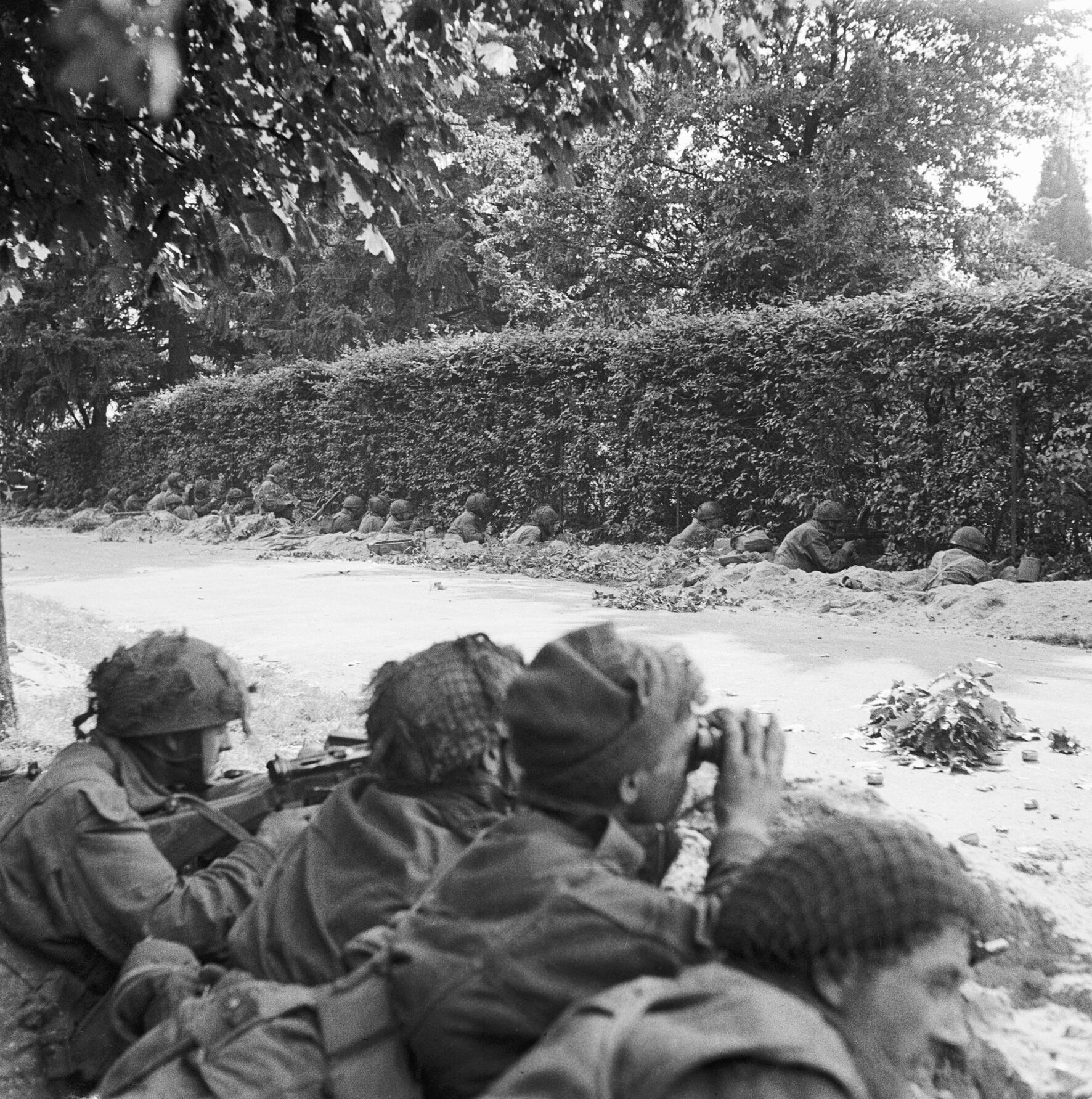
- Men from the 1st Airborne Division during Operation Market Garden fighting in the battle of Arnhem, September 1944.
- Active: 1941–1945
- Country: United Kingdom
- Branch: British Army
- Type: Infantry
- Role: Airborne forces
- Size: Division, 12,148 men
- Part of: I Airborne Corps
- Nickname: Red Devils (Note: The 1st Parachute Brigade had been called the "Rote Teufel" or "Red Devils" by the German troops they had fought in North Africa. The title was officially confirmed by General Sir Harold Alexander and henceforth applied to all British airborne troops.)
- Engagements: Operation Biting; Operation Freshman; Operation Turkey Buzzard; Operation Ladbroke; Operation Fustian; Operation Slapstick; Battle of Arnhem; Operation Doomsday

Commanders
- Notable commanders: Frederick Browning; George Hopkinson; Ernest Down; Roy Urquhart

Insignia
- Identification symbol

The 1st Airborne Division was an airborne infantry division of the British Army during the Second World War. The division was formed in late 1941 during the Second World War, after the British Prime Minister, Winston Churchill, demanded an airborne force, and was initially under command of Major General Frederick A. M. "Boy" Browning. The division was one of two airborne divisions raised by the British Army during the war, with the other being the 6th Airborne Division, created in May 1943, using former units of the 1st Airborne Division.

The division's first two missions—Operation Biting, a parachute landing in France, and Operation Freshman, a glider mission in Norway—were both raids. Part of the division was sent to North Africa at the end of 1942, where it fought in an infantry role during the Tunisian campaign over the next few weeks, and when the Allies invaded Sicily in July 1943, the division undertook two brigade sized landings. The first, Operation Ladbroke, carried out by glider infantry of the 1st Airlanding Brigade and the second, Operation Fustian, by the 1st Parachute Brigade, were far from completely successful. The 1st Airborne Division then took part in a mostly diversionary amphibious landing, codenamed Operation Slapstick, as part of the Allied invasion of Italy in September 1943.

In December, most of the 1st Airborne Division (minus the 2nd Parachute Brigade, left behind in Italy) returned to England, and began training and preparing for the Allied invasion of Normandy. It was not involved in the Normandy landings in June 1944, being held in reserve. In September 1944 the 1st Airborne took part in Operation Market Garden. The division, with the Polish 1st Parachute Brigade temporarily attached, landed 60 miles (97 km) behind German lines, to capture crossings on the River Rhine, and fought in the Battle of Arnhem. After failing to achieve its objectives, the division was surrounded and took very heavy casualties, but held out for nine days before the survivors were evacuated.

The remnants of the 1st Airborne Division returned to England soon after. The division never fully recovered from their losses at Arnhem and the 4th Parachute Brigade was disbanded. Just after the end of the war in Europe, the depleted formation took part in Operation Doomsday in Norway in May 1945. They were tasked with the disarmament and repatriation of the German occupation army. The 1st Airborne Division then returned to England and was disbanded in November 1945.

== Background ==
Inspired by the success of German airborne operations during the Battle of France, British Prime Minister Winston Churchill directed the War Office to investigate the possibility of creating a force of 5,000 parachute troops. As a result, on 22 June 1940, No. 2 Commando assumed parachute duties, and on 21 November was re-designated the 11th Special Air Service Battalion, with a parachute and glider wing.

On 21 June 1940 the Central Landing Establishment was formed at Ringway airfield near Manchester. Although tasked primarily with training parachute troops, it was also directed to investigate the use of gliders to transport troops into battle. At the same time, the Ministry of Aircraft Production contracted General Aircraft Ltd to design and produce a glider for this purpose. The result was the General Aircraft Hotspur, which was capable of transporting eight soldiers and was used for both assault and training purposes.

The success of the first British airborne raid, Operation Colossus, prompted the War Office to expand the airborne force through the creation of the Parachute Regiment, and to develop plans to convert several infantry battalions into parachute and glider battalions. On 31 May 1941, a joint army and air force memorandum was approved by the Chiefs-of-Staff and Winston Churchill; it recommended that the British airborne forces should consist of two parachute brigades, one based in England and the other in the Middle East, and that a glider force of 10,000 men should be created.

== Formation history ==
The existing 11th Special Air Service Battalion was renamed the 1st Parachute Battalion on 15 September 1941, and, together with the newly raised 2nd and 3rd Parachute Battalions, formed the first of the new airborne formations, the 1st Parachute Brigade, commanded by Brigadier Richard Gale, who would later command the 6th Airborne Division from 1943 to 1944. The 2nd and 3rd Parachute Battalions were formed from volunteers, between the ages of nineteen and forty, who were already serving in infantry units. Only ten men from any one unit were allowed to volunteer. Paratroops were paid an extra 2/- per day.

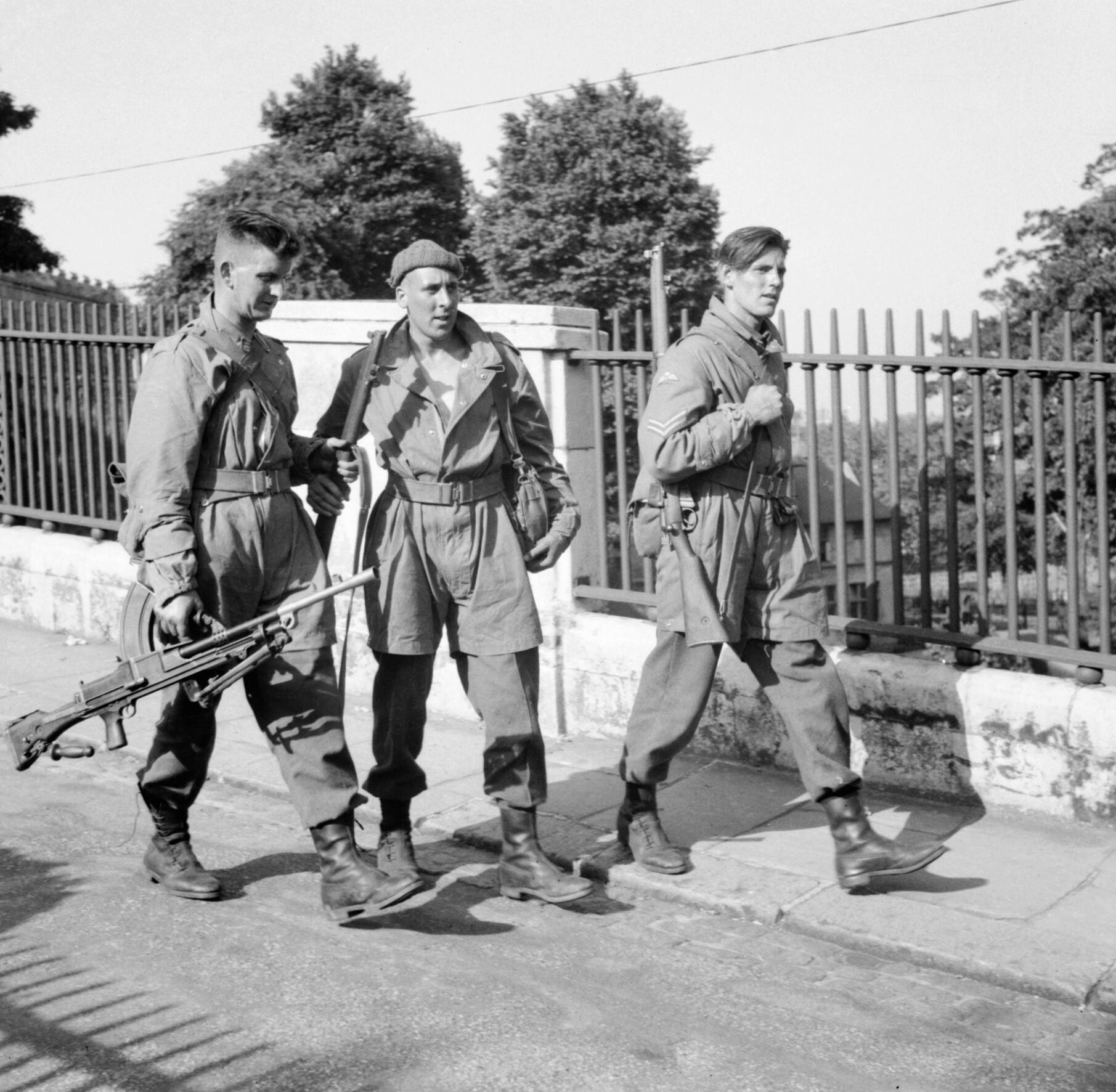
British paratroopers training in Norwich, England, June 1941

In October 1941, Brigadier Frederick Arthur Montague "Boy" Browning was promoted to major general, named the Commander Parachute and Airborne Troops, and ordered to form a headquarters to develop and train airborne forces. The next unit formed was the 1st Airlanding Brigade on 10 October 1941, by the conversion of the mountain warfare trained 31st Independent Infantry Brigade Group, commanded by Brigadier George Frederick "Hoppy" Hopkinson, later to command the division. The brigade comprised four battalions: the 1st Border Regiment, 2nd South Staffordshire Regiment, 2nd Oxford and Bucks Light Infantry, and the 1st Royal Ulster Rifles. The men who were unsuitable for airborne forces were replaced by volunteers from other units. By the end of the year Browning's command had become the headquarters of 1st Airborne Division.

Browning expressed his opinion that the force must not be sacrificed in "penny packets", and urged the formation of a third brigade. Permission was granted, and on 17 July 1942, the 2nd Parachute Brigade, commanded by Brigadier Ernest Down, who would later succeed Hopkinson in command of the division, was formed. The 2nd Parachute Brigade was assigned the existing 4th Parachute Battalion, and two new battalions converted from line infantry units, the 5th (Scottish) Parachute Battalion, converted from the 7th Battalion, Queen's Own Cameron Highlanders, and the 6th (Royal Welch) Parachute Battalion, from the 10th Battalion, Royal Welch Fusiliers.

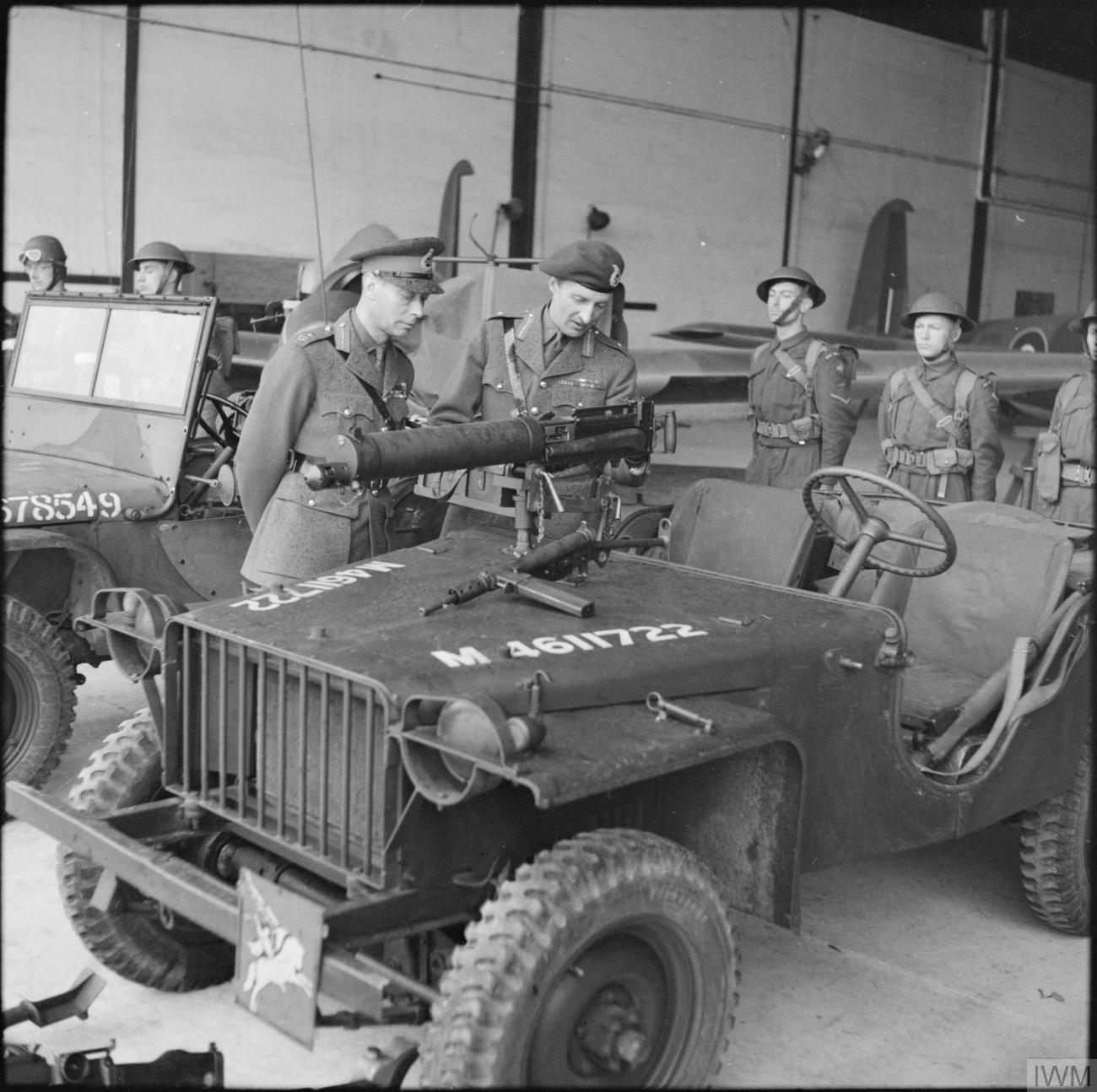
King George VI inspects an airborne jeep fitted with a Vickers machine gun during a visit to the airborne forces in Southern Command, 21 May 1942. With him is Major General "Boy" Browning, GOC of the 1st Airborne Division.

The 3rd Parachute Brigade was formed in November 1942 and assigned to the 1st Airborne Division. The brigade, under Brigadier Alexander Stanier, comprised the 7th (Light Infantry) Parachute Battalion, previously the 10th Battalion, Somerset Light Infantry, the 8th (Midlands) Parachute Battalion, converted from the 13th Battalion, Royal Warwickshire Regiment, and the 9th (Eastern and Home Counties) Parachute Battalion, formerly the 10th Battalion, Essex Regiment.

Soon afterwards, the 1st Parachute Brigade left the division, to take part in Operation Torch, the Allied invasion of North Africa and ended up participating in numerous operations in North Africa, including three parachute operations, although it was more often fighting in an infantry role.

In April 1943, the commander of the 1st Airlanding Brigade, Hopkinson, was promoted to major general and given command of the division in succession to Browning. Later that year, the division was deployed to Tunisia for operations in the Mediterranean theatre, where it would adopt the unofficial battlecry "Waho Mohammed!” from the local Arabs, which was quickly adopted by other British airborne units and would be used all the way through the Battle of Arnhem. The 3rd Parachute Brigade and two battalions from the 1st Airlanding Brigade—the 1st Ulster Rifles and 2nd Ox and Bucks—remained behind in England, forming the nucleus of the new6th Airborne Division.

The 1st Airborne Division was reinforced by the 4th Parachute Brigade, that had been formed in the Middle East during 1942. In addition to the 156th Parachute Battalion, which had been raised from British troops stationed in India, it comprised the 10th and 11th Parachute Battalions, which had been raised from troops based in Egypt and Palestine.

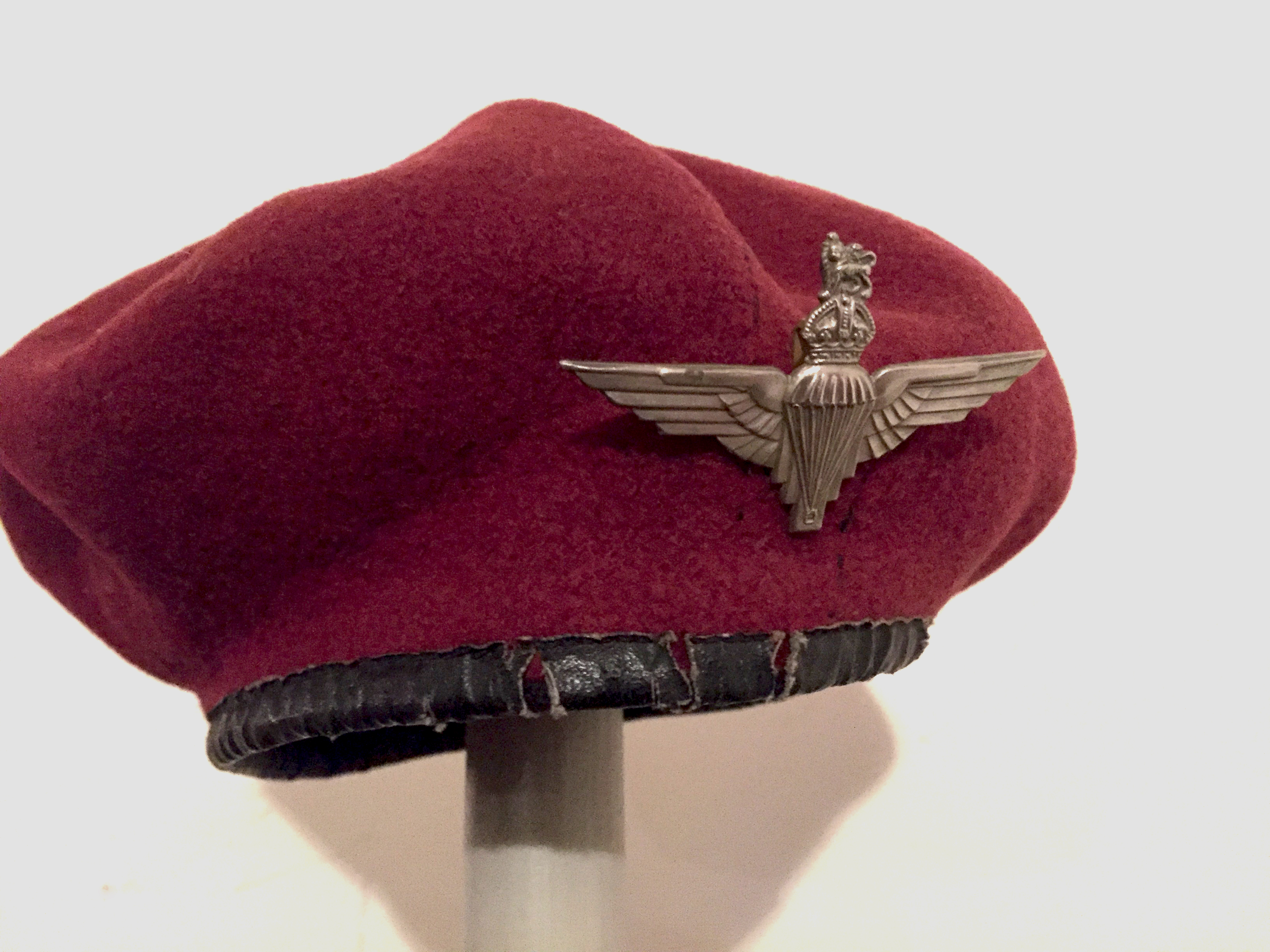
Pegasus 1st Airborne beret

The division took part in two brigade sized operations in the Allied invasion of Sicily, and an amphibious assault at Taranto in the Allied invasion of Italy. During the fighting in Italy, Major General Ernest Down became the divisional commander, after his predecessor, Major General Hopkinson, died of wounds received in the fighting. After brief service in Italy, the division returned to England in December 1943, leaving the 2nd Parachute Brigade behind as an independent formation.

After the division arrived in England, Down was posted to India to oversee the formation of the 44th Indian Airborne Division, and was replaced by Major General Roy Urquhart. In September 1944, for Operation Market Garden in the Netherlands, the 1st Polish Parachute Brigade was attached to the division. Following Market Garden, fewer than 2,200 men from the 10,000 that were sent to the Netherlands returned to the British lines.

Having suffered such severe casualties, the 4th Parachute Brigade was disbanded, with its survivors being posted to the 1st Parachute Brigade. The division then went through a period of reorganisation, but had still not fully recovered by the end of the war, due to the acute shortage of manpower throughout the British Army in 1944–1945. Still under strength in May 1945 with the End of World War II in Europe, it was sent to Norway to disarm the German army of occupation; returning to Britain in November 1945 where the 1st Airborne Division was disbanded.

== Operational history ==
=== France ===
Operation Biting, also known as the Bruneval Raid, was the codename for a raid by Combined Operations in 1942. Their objective was a German Würzburg radar installation at Bruneval in France. Due to the extensive coastal defences erected by the Germans to protect the array, it was thought a commando raid from the sea would incur heavy losses, and give the garrison sufficient time for the radar equipment to be destroyed. It was therefore decided that an airborne assault followed by sea-borne evacuation would be the ideal way to surprise the garrison and seize the technology intact.

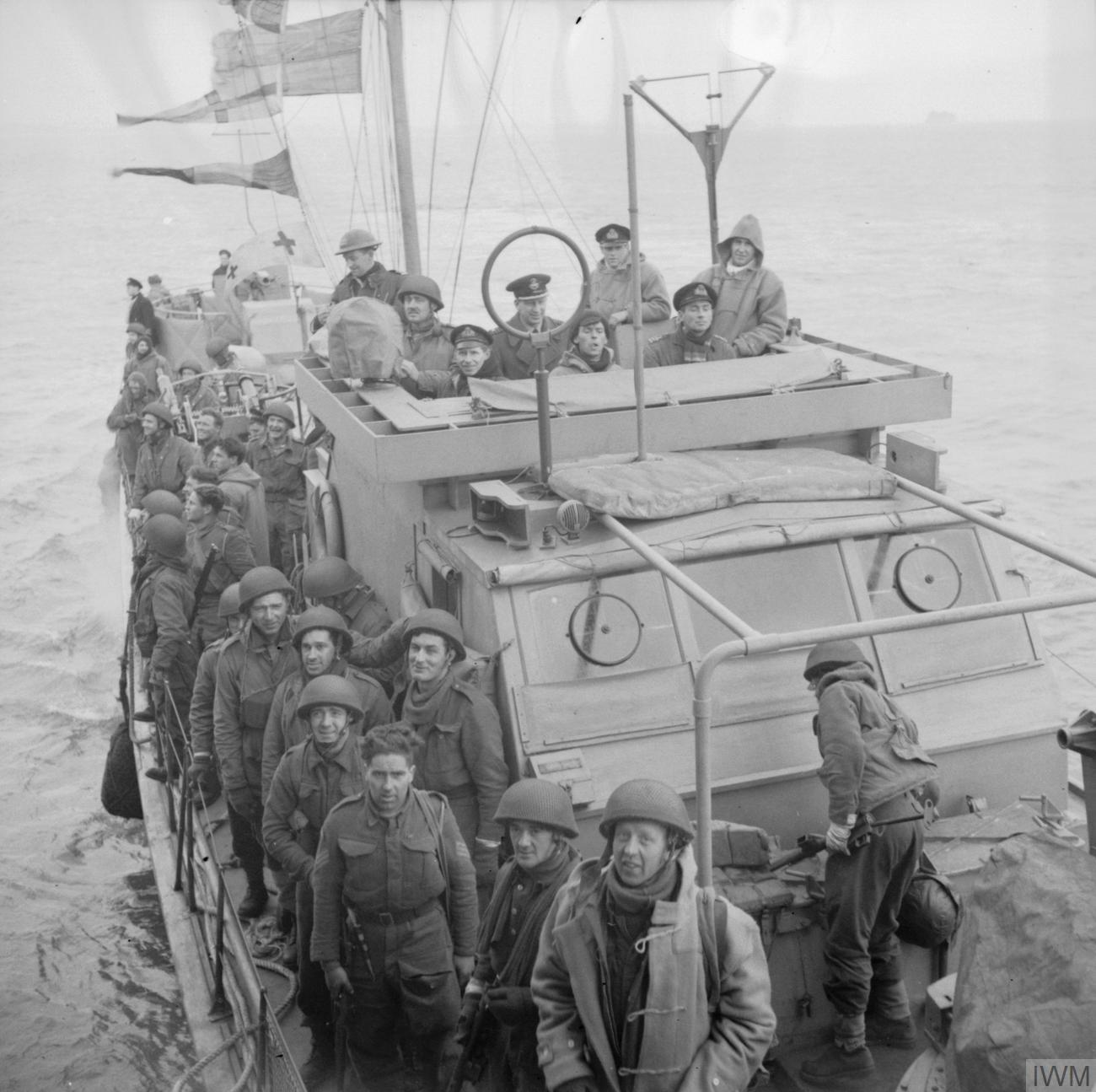
Men of 'C' Company returning from the successful Bruneval Raid

On the night of 27 February, 'C' Company, 2nd Parachute Battalion, under the command of Major John Frost, parachuted into France a few miles from the installation. The force then proceeded to assault the villa in which the radar equipment was kept, killing several members of the German garrison and capturing the installation after a brief fire-fight.

A technician that had come with the force partially dismantled the Würzburg radar array and removed several key pieces to take back to Britain; the raiding force then retreated to the evacuation beach. The detachment assigned to clear the beach had failed to do so, however, and another brief fire-fight was required to eliminate the Germans guarding the beach. The raiding force was then picked up by a small number of landing craft and transferred to several Motor Gun Boats which brought them back to Britain. The raid was entirely successful. The airborne troops suffered only a few casualties, and the pieces of the radar they brought back, along with a German radar technician, allowed British scientists to understand German advances in radar and to create counter-measures to neutralise those advances.

=== Norway ===
Operation Freshman was the first British airborne operation conducted using gliders, its target was the Vemork Norsk Hydro chemical plant in Norway, which produced heavy water for Nazi Germany. By 1942 the German atomic weapons programme had come close to being able to develop a nuclear reactor, but in order for the reactor to function it would require a great deal of heavy water. The source of this water was the Norsk Hydro plant, which had been occupied in 1940; when the British government learned of the German nuclear developments, it was decided that a raid would be launched to destroy the plant and deny the Germans the heavy water. Several tactics were discussed and discarded as impractical, and it was finally decided that a small force from the 1st Airborne Division, comprising 30 sappers from 9 Field Company RE (Airborne), Royal Engineers, would land by glider a short distance from the plant, and demolish it with explosives.

Two aircraft, each towing one glider, left Scotland on the night of 19 November 1942. All managed to reach the Norwegian coast, but none were able to reach their objective. The first pair suffered from navigational difficulties and severe weather, which resulted in the tow rope snapping and the first glider crash-landing, with its towing aircraft returning to base; eight airborne troops were killed outright, four were severely injured and five unhurt. The survivors were captured shortly after the crash. The second pair fared even worse, with both aircraft and glider crashing into a mountain for unknown reasons; the aircrew and several men were killed outright, and those who survived were taken prisoner. None of the prisoners survived for very long, being either poisoned or executed as a result of Adolf Hitler's Commando Order, which stated that all British Commandos personnel were to be killed immediately when captured.

=== Sicily ===
Operation Turkey Buzzard, also known as Operation Beggar, was a supply mission to North Africa that took place between March and August 1943. The mission was undertaken by the division's glider pilots and No. 295 Squadron Royal Air Force, as part of the preparations for the invasion of Sicily. The mission involved Halifax bombers towing Horsa gliders 3,200 miles (5,100 km) from England to Tunisia. The Horsas were needed to complement the smaller American Waco gliders, which did not have the capacity required for the planned operations. During the mission two German Condor patrol aircraft located and shot down a Halifax-and-Horsa combination. Altogether five Horsas and three Halifaxes were lost, but 27 Horsas arrived in Tunisia in time to participate in the invasion of Sicily.

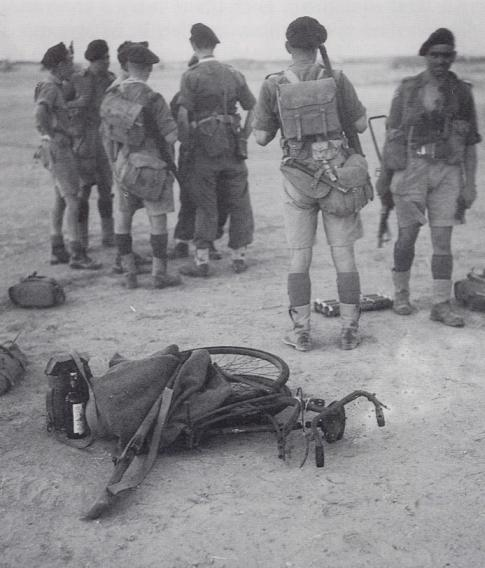
Men from the Border Regiment preparing to take off on Operation Ladbroke, with a folding airborne bicycle in the foreground

Operation Ladbroke was a glider assault by the 1st Airlanding Brigade near Syracuse, that began on 9 July 1943 as part of the invasion of Sicily. The brigade were equipped with 144 Waco and six Horsa gliders. Their objective was to land near the town of Syracuse, secure the Ponte Grande Bridge, and ultimately take control of the city itself with its strategically important docks.

On the way to Sicily, 65 gliders were released too early by the towing aircraft and crashed into the sea, drowning around 252 men. Of the remainder, only 87 men arrived at the Pont Grande Bridge, which they successfully captured and held beyond the time they were to be relieved. Finally, with their ammunition expended and only 15 soldiers remaining unwounded, they surrendered to the Italian forces. The Italians sought to demolish the bridge after regaining control of it, but were unable to do so because the airborne forces had removed the explosive charges. Other troops from the airlanding brigade, who had landed elsewhere in Sicily, destroyed communications links and captured artillery batteries.

Operation Fustian, the division's second mission in Sicily, was carried out by the 1st Parachute Brigade. Their objective was the Primosole Bridge across the Simeto River. The intention was for the parachute brigade, with glider-borne forces in support, to land on both sides of the river. While one battalion seized the bridge, the other two battalions would establish defensive positions to the north and south. They would then hold the bridge until relieved by the advance of XIII Corps, part of the Eighth Army which had landed on the southeastern coast three days previously.

The start of the operation was a disaster. Many of the aircraft carrying the paratroopers from North Africa were shot down, or were damaged and turned back, due to both friendly fire and enemy action. The evasive action taken by the pilots scattered the brigade over a large area, and only the equivalent of two companies of troops were landed in the correct locations. Despite this and the defence by German and Italian forces, the British paratroops captured the bridge. Resisting attacks from the north and south, they held out against increasing odds until nightfall.

The relieving force led by the 50th (Northumbrian) Infantry Division, which was short of transport, found it hard going to reach the parachute brigade and were still 1 mile (1.6 km) away when they halted for the night. By this time, with casualties mounting and supplies running short, the brigade commander, Brigadier Gerald Lathbury, had relinquished control of the bridge to the Germans. The following day the British units joined forces, and the 9th Battalion, Durham Light Infantry with armour support attempted to recapture the bridge. It was not finally secured until three days after the start of the operation, when another battalion of the Durham Light Infantry, led by the paratroopers, established a bridgehead on the northern bank of the river.

=== Italy ===
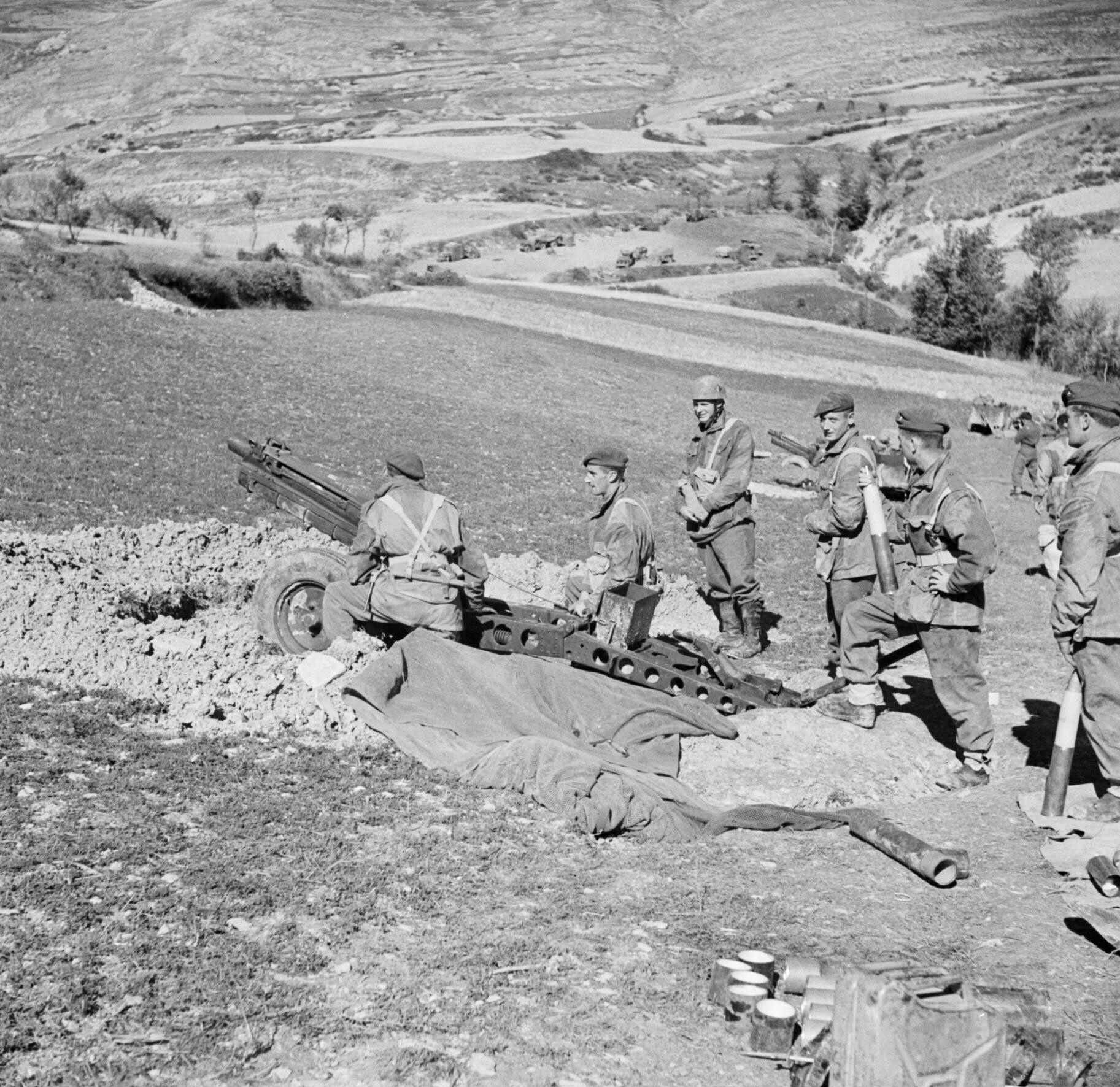
Men of 1st Airlanding Light Regiment, Royal Artillery in action in Italy, where their initial deployment was by sea instead of by air.

Operation Slapstick was an amphibious landing at the Italian port of Taranto, part of the invasion of Italy in September 1943. The mission had been planned at short notice, following an offer by the Italian government to open the ports of Taranto and Brindisi on the heel of Italy to the Allies. The 1st Airborne Division was selected to undertake the mission, but at the time they were located in North Africa. A shortage of transport aircraft meant the division could not land by parachute and glider, and all the landing craft in the area were already allocated to the other landings: Operation Avalanche at Salerno on the western coast, and Operation Baytown at Calabria. Instead, the division had to be transported across the Mediterranean by ships of the Royal Navy. The landing was unopposed, and the airborne division successfully captured the ports of Taranto, and later Brindisi on the Adriatic coast, in working order.

The only German forces in the area were elements of the German 1st Parachute Division, which engaged the advancing British in ambushes and at roadblocks during a fighting withdrawal north. By the end of September, the 1st Airborne Division had advanced 125 miles (201 km) to Foggia. Reinforcements from two infantry divisions, the 8th Indian and British 78th, had by then been landed behind them, which allowed the airborne troops to be withdrawn back to Taranto.

Despite casualties for the 1st Airborne Division in Italy being relatively light, the General Officer Commanding (GOC), Major General George Hopkinson, was killed while watching an assault by the 10th Parachute Battalion where he was mortally wounded by a burst of machine gun fire. He was replaced by Brigadier Ernest Down, previously the commander of 2nd Parachute Brigade.

=== England ===
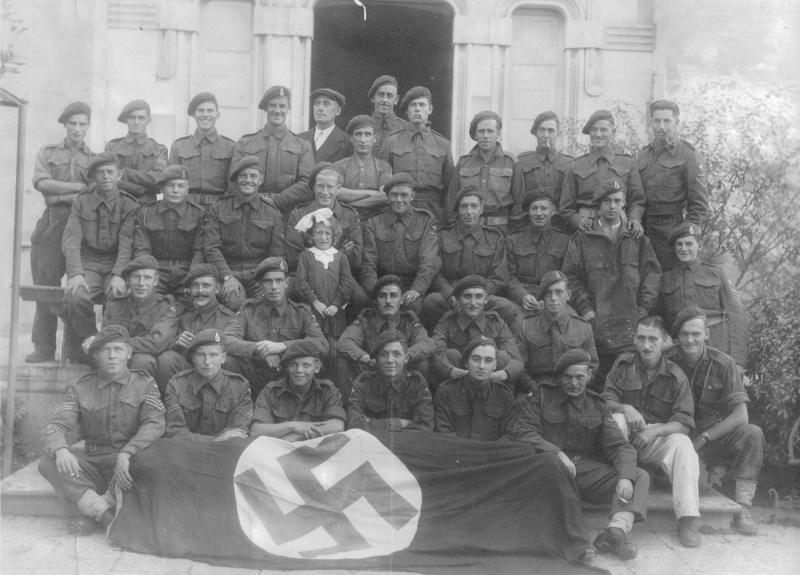
Men of the 1st Airlanding Brigade signal section and Italian civilians posing with a captured German flag, Italy, October 1943.

By December 1943 the division had returned to England and begun training for operations in North-West Europe under the supervision of I Airborne Corps. Although the 1st Airborne Division was not scheduled to take part in the Normandy landings, a contingency plan, Operation Wasteage, was drawn up whereby the division would be parachuted in to support any of the five invasion beaches if serious delays were experienced. This plan turned out not to be required.

While the 6th Airborne Division were still fighting in Normandy, numerous plans to parachute the 1st Airborne Division into France were formulated, all to no avail. In June and July 1944, the plans included Operation Reinforcement, which was a landing to the west of St Sauveur-le-Vicomte to support the US 82nd Airborne Division, and Operation Wild Oats that would have seen the division land south of Caen to meet the advancing 7th Armoured Division moving from Villers-Bocage and the 51st (Highland) Infantry Division and 4th Armoured Brigade advancing south out of the Orne bridgehead in a move to encircle and capture Caen. Such an airborne operation was vetoed by Trafford Leigh-Mallory, as being too risky for the aircraft involved. At any rate, the land portion of the attack (generally considered to be part of Operation Perch) bogged down due to German resistance and the delayed deployment of troops to Normandy.

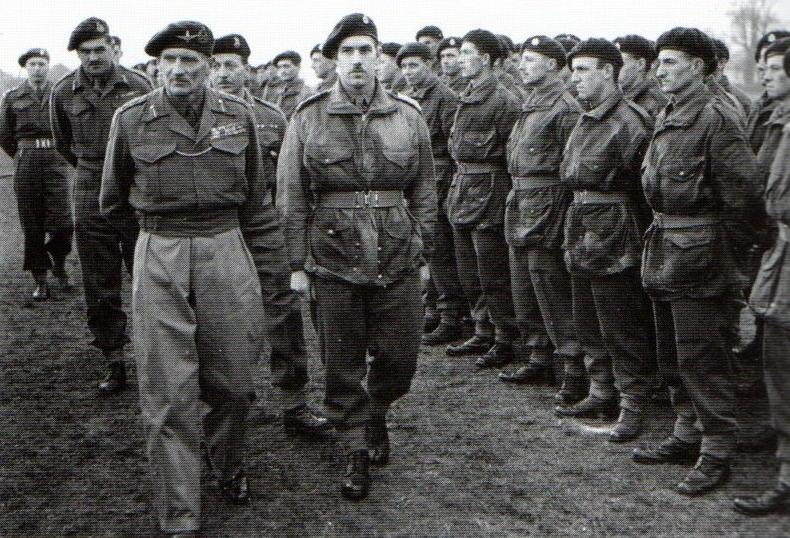
General Montgomery, accompanied by senior officers, visits men of the 133rd (Parachute) Field Ambulance at Oakham, March 1944.

There was also Operation Beneficiary, intended to support the American VIII Corps in capturing St Malo, and Operation Lucky Strike which had the objective of seizing bridges across the River Seine at Rouen. In Operation Sword Hilt, the division was to isolate the port of Brest and destroy the Morlaix viaduct. Operation Hands Up was intended to support the US Third Army by seizing the Vannes airfield.

By August the division was still waiting to be deployed, but now plans envisioned using them as part of a larger force. Operation Transfigure involved the division, the 52nd (Lowland) Infantry Division, the US 101st Airborne Division, and the 1st Polish Parachute Brigade landing at Rambouillet St Arnoult, to close the gap between Orléans and Paris. Operation Axehead, using the same force, was to seize the bridges over the River Seine in support of 21st Army Group. Operation Boxer, with the same force, was to seize Boulogne and assault V1 flying bomb sites.

Near the end of the month, Operation Linnet, with the same units as before, was formulated to seize crossings over the Escaut. Operation Infatuate, drawn up in early September, involved the entire I Airborne Corps landing in Belgium to trap the retreating German armies in the Scheldt estuary, as well as aiming to threaten Antwerp.

Finally, in September, there was Operation Comet, in which the division's three brigades were to land in the Netherlands and each capture a river crossing. The first of these was the bridge over the River Waal at Nijmegen, the second the bridge over the River Maas at Grave, and the last was the bridge over the River Rhine at Arnhem. Planning for Comet was well advanced when on 10 September the mission was cancelled. Instead, a new operation was proposed with the same objectives as Comet but to be carried out by three divisions of the First Allied Airborne Army.

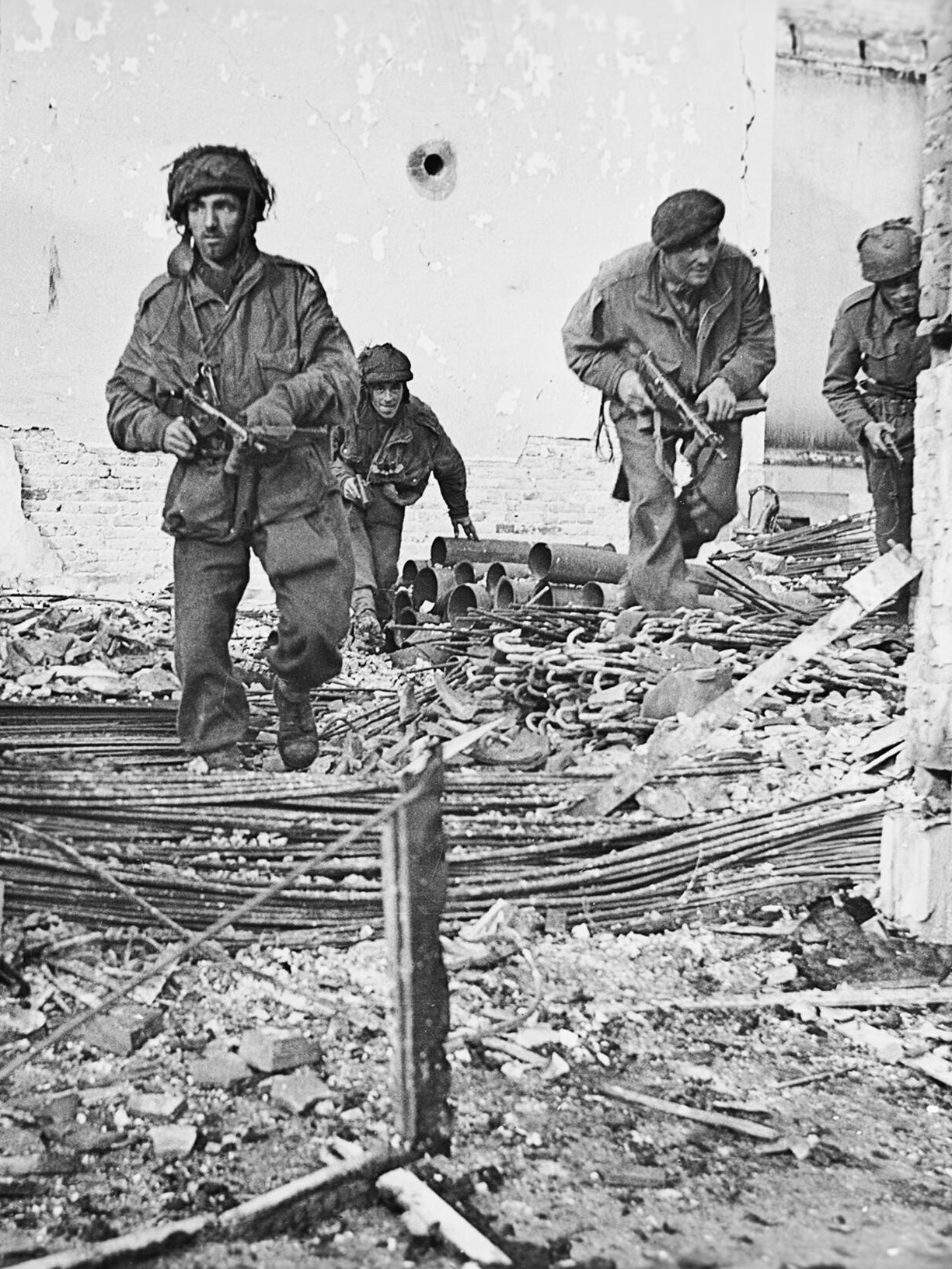
Men of 156th Parachute Battalion in Oosterbeek, where the majority of 1st Airborne Division became trapped

=== Arnhem ===
Operation Market Garden was an airborne assault by three divisions in the Netherlands in September 1944, including the British 1st and the American 82nd Airborne Division and 101st Airborne Division, to secure key bridges and towns along the expected Allied axis of advance. Farthest north, 1st Airborne, supported by the 1st Polish Parachute Brigade, landed at Arnhem to secure bridges across the Nederrijn. Initially expecting an easy advance, XXX Corps, under Lieutenant General Brian Horrocks, to reach the airborne force at Arnhem within two to three days.

The 1st Airborne Division landed some distance from its objectives and was quickly hampered by unexpected resistance, especially from elements of the 9th SS and 10th SS Panzer Divisions. Only a small force was able to reach the Arnhem road bridge, while the main body of the division was halted on the outskirts of the city. Meanwhile, XXX Corps was unable to advance north as quickly as anticipated and failed to relieve the airborne troops.

After four days, the small British force at the bridge was overwhelmed and the rest of the division became trapped in a pocket north of the river, where they could not be sufficiently reinforced by the Poles, or by XXX Corps when it arrived on the southern bank. After nine days of fighting, the shattered remains of the airborne forces were eventually withdrawn south of the Rhine. 1st Airborne lost 8,000 men during the battle and never saw combat again.

=== Norway post-war ===
In May 1945, immediately after the Allied Victory in Europe Day, the 1st Airborne Division was sent to disarm and repatriate the 350,000-strong German occupation army in Norway. The division maintained law and order until the arrival of the occupation force, Force 134. During its time in Norway, the division was tasked with supervising the surrender of the German forces in Norway, as well as preventing the sabotage of important military and civilian facilities.

The German Instrument of Surrender was delivered on 8 May to General Franz Böhme, the commander of all German forces stationed in Norway; the 1st Airborne Division landed near Oslo and Stavanger between 9 and 11 May. Most of the transport aircraft carrying the division landed safely, but one crash caused several fatalities. The division encountered little of the expected German resistance. Operational duties included welcoming back King Haakon, looking after Allied ex-prisoners of war, arresting war criminals and supervising the clearing of minefields. While in Norway, the division was also able to investigate what happened to the airborne troops who had taken part in Operation Freshman. The division returned to Britain, and was disbanded on 26 August 1945.

== Commanders ==
Commanders of the division were;

- 1941–1943: Major General Sir Frederick Arthur Montague Browning GCVO KBE CB DSO
- 1943: Major General George Frederick Hopkinson OBE MC
- 1943: Major General Ernest Edward Down, KBE, CB
- 1944–1945: Major General Robert Elliott Urquhart CB DSO

== Order of battle ==
The division had the following composition:

- 1st Parachute Brigade
- 1st Airlanding Brigade
- 2nd Parachute Brigade
- 3rd Parachute Brigade
- 4th Parachute Brigade
- Divisional troops
  - Divisional headquarters and signal squadron
  - 1st Airlanding Light Regiment, Royal Artillery
  - 1st Airlanding Anti-Tank Regiment, Royal Artillery
    - 204th (Oban) Independent Anti-Tank Battery (later 2nd Airlanding Anti-Tank Battery)
    - 1st Airlanding Anti-Tank Battery
    - 5th Airlanding Anti-Tank Battery
  - 283rd Light Anti-Aircraft (LAA) Battery (later 1st (City of London Yeomanry) Airlanding LAA Battery) (left 21 February 1944)
  - 1st Forward (Airborne) Observation Unit, Royal Artillery
  - 21st Independent Parachute Company, Army Air Corps
  - 1st Airborne Reconnaissance Squadron
  - 9th (Airborne) Field Company, Royal Engineers
  - 261st (Airborne) Field Park Company, Royal Engineers
  - 591st (Antrim) Airborne Squadron, Royal Engineers (from 1 June 1945)
  - 1st Airborne Division Postal Unit, Royal Engineers
  - 250th (Airborne) Light Company, Royal Army Service Corps
  - 93rd Company, Royal Army Service Corps
  - Detachment Ordnance Field Park
  - Detachment, Royal Electrical and Mechanical Engineers Workshop
  - 89th Field Security Section, Intelligence Corps
  - 1st Airborne Division, Provost Company, Royal Military Police

== See also ==
- Theirs is the Glory
- List of British divisions in World War II

== Notes ==
Footnotes

Citations
