= Geoff Barkway =

- Born: 18 September 1921; London, England
- Died: 8 June 2006 (aged 84)
- Military career
- Allegiance: United Kingdom
- Branch: British Army
- Service years: 1939 – 1945
- Rank: Staff Sergeant
- Unit: Glider Pilot Regiment
- Conflicts: Second World War: Battle of Normandy
- Awards: Distinguished Flying Medal
- Other work: Engineer

Staff Sergeant Geoff Barkway DFM (18 September 1921 – 8 June 2006) was a member of the Glider Pilot Regiment who achieved fame as the pilot of the third Horsa glider to land at Pegasus Bridge in the early hours of 6 June 1944. This remarkable achievement was described as "the greatest feat of flying of the second world war" by Air Chief Marshal Sir Trafford Leigh-Mallory. Shortly after the landing he was shot in the arm and later had it amputated when gangrene set in.

== Early life ==
He was born in London on 18 September 1921, and educated at Leyton Technical College. He became an apprentice fitter and turner at London and North Eastern Railway, then joined the Royal Signals Territorial Army in February 1939. Mobilised at 17, he transferred to the railways branch of the Royal Engineers. In 1942 he volunteered for training as a glider pilot, and, after completing a rigorous infantry training course, learned to fly powered aircraft and then gliders.

== Pegasus Bridge ==
The glider that he flew landed in occupied France shortly after midnight. The two previous gliders had occupied much of the landing area and he was forced to swerve left then right to avoid number two flown by Oliver Boland. This resulted in it rotating right by 90 degrees, breaking in half and the nose ending up in a pond. Geoff Barkway was catapulted through the nose and momentarily lost consciousness. Recovering he returned to the aircraft and assisted in releasing some of his passengers who had become entangled.

Shortly afterwards he was unloading ammunition when he was shot in the right arm. When he awoke in the café alongside the bridge, his arm was in a sling and he had lost a lot of blood. He was recovered to a Portsmouth hospital, where he was to lose his arm as a result of gangrene.

== Post war ==
Geoff Barkway was invalided from the Army in 1945 and, after a year's rehabilitation, obtained an Engineering degree at Kingston Technical College. He then had a long career with London Transport, which included responsibility for the operation of tests on Stages Two and Three of the Victoria line. In 1973 he became a divisional engineer. After retiring in 1981, he became a consultant in underground transport systems in New York City and Singapore.

He married Eileen Underwood, whom he had met when she was serving with the ATS, in 1945. They had two sons and two daughters.
