= Priamo Leonardi =

Italian admiral (1888–1984)

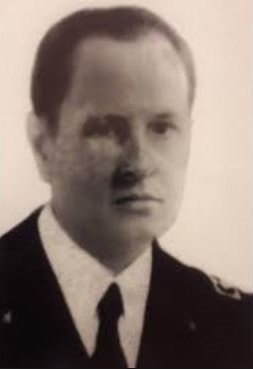
- Born: 2 October 1888; Borgotaro, Emilia-Romagna, Italy
- Died: 16 March 1984 (aged 95); Parma, Emilia-Romagna, Italy
- Military career
- Allegiance: Kingdom of Italy
- Branch: Regia Marina
- Service years: 1907–1946
- Rank: Contrammiraglio (Rear Admiral)
- Commands: Monfalcone (destroyer); Francesco Crispi (destroyer); Tigre (destroyer); Lepanto (minelayer); Bartolomeo Colleoni (light cruiser); Eritrea (colonial ship); Toulon Naval Fortress Area; Augusta-Syracuse Naval Fortress Area
- Conflicts: Italo-Turkish War; World War I; Adriatic Campaign; Spanish Civil War; World War II; Battle of the Mediterranean; Invasion of Sicily; Operation Ladbroke
- Awards: Silver Medal of Military Valor

Priamo Leonardi (2 October 1888 – 16 March 1984) was an Italian admiral during World War II.

== Early life and career ==
Priamo Leonardi was born in Borgotaro, near Parma, in 1888, and entered the Italian Naval Academy at Livorno in 1907. He was commissioned as an ensign in 1911, and in the same year he participated in the Italo-Turkish War on board the armoured cruiser Amalfi.

After promotion to lieutenant, Leonardi participated in World War I, first serving on board the armoured cruiser Francesco Ferruccio, then on the battleship Duilio and later in the Albania Naval High Command. In 1920 he obtained his first command, a torpedo boat. Between 1926 and 1928, having been promoted to lieutenant commander, Leonardi commanded the destroyers Monfalcone and Francesco Crispi; in 1928 he was promoted to commander and assigned to the Intelligence Office of the Regia Marina Headquarters. Between 1933 and 1934 he commanded the Leone-class destroyer Tigre in the Red Sea, and between 1934 and 1935 he was the commanding officer of the minelayer Lepanto, stationed in Shanghai.

In 1936 Leonardi was promoted to captain and given command of the light cruiser Bartolomeo Colleoni. He remained in command of Colleoni till 1938, taking part in the Spanish Civil War; in 1938, he became commander of the colonial ship Eritrea, stationed in the Red Sea.

== World War II and aftermath ==
When World War II broke out, Leonardi was the deputy commander of the La Spezia Arsenal. Later on, he became chief of staff of the Northern Adriatic Naval Department, and was promoted to rear admiral in 1942. In January 1943, following the Axis occupation of Vichy France, he became commander of the newly established Italian Naval Command in Toulon, as well as chief of staff of the Provence Naval Department.

On 8 June 1943, Leonardi was appointed commander of the Augusta-Syracuse Naval Fortress Area. This was the most heavily armed fortress in Sicily, with six coastal batteries of large and medium caliber (381 mm, 254 mm, 152 mm), 17 anti-aircraft batteries (102 and 76 mm guns), two armed pontoons (armed with 149 and 190 mm guns) on the seaward side; like many fortresses and bases of the Regia Marina, however, whereas the seaward side was strongly fortified, the defences on the landward side were far weaker. The landward defence perimeter, 50 km long, consisted of a chain of 30 coastal strongholds manned by two coastal battalions. When the Allied forces landed in Sicily, on 10 July 1943, no amphibious landing was carried out against Augusta; to avoid facing the formidable coastal defences of Augusta, a column of the Eighth Army landed between Avola and Pachino and then attacked Syracuse from the weakly defended landward side, across the Anapo river. Airborne troops also took part in the attack against Augusta and Syracuse in Operation Ladbroke. Admiral Leonardi tried to stem the British advance with tumultuary troops, but to little avail, as he had no artillery (Augusta, as mentioned, was only armed with coastal and anti-aircraft batteries: the former could be useful to repel an amphibious landing, and the latter against aircraft, but both were useless against a ground attack) or organic troops. While British forces steamrolled towards Syracuse and the interior, Leonardi tried to organize a counter-attack in co-operation with German units, but on the night between 10 and 11 July – while Leonardi was absent from Augusta, having gone in the backcountry to organize the counter-attack – many the troops that manned the Augusta defences, and especially the units of the Coastal Artillery Militia (MILMART, a Blackshirt branch tasked with coastal defense, whose personnel was recruited locally, and whose morale was particularly low because of the dire conditions of their families and their fear of being executed for being Fascist) abandoned their posts, blew up batteries and fortifications, disbanded and went home. When he was informed of this, Leonardi put together some units with second-line troops and dispersed soldiers and tried again to organize a defense together with German units; he "spent the next few days dashing from unit to unit, to bolster morale and to keep in touch with his disparate and dispersed forces", and at one point, on 12 July, he personally reactivated an abandoned MILMART battery and opened fire on the first British destroyer that entered Augusta harbour. These movements, however, also had the effect of preventing many subordinates from contacting him, causing further confusion. The abandonment and destruction of the coastal batteries enabled the Royal Navy to land troops directly in Augusta; despite fierce fighting in some areas, both Augusta and Syracuse fell by 13 July. Leonardi himself was captured by British forces six days later and sent to a POW camp in Great Britain, where he remained till November 1944.

The command of the Sixth Army, tasked with the defence of Sicily, held Leonardi responsible of the fall of the Augusta-Syracuse fortress and proposed a court-martial for him, but no trial was held. The Salò Republic, however, looking for scapegoats in the military to justify the defeat of Italy, branded Leonardi as a traitor and a coward, falsely accusing him of having ordered the destruction of the coastal batteries and having surrendered Augusta without a fight; he was tried and sentenced to death in absentia by a Fascist kangaroo court in May 1944. After the end of the war, in November 1945, a formal enquiry was held on Leonardi's behaviour; the enquiry concluded that the admiral had done everything he could during the invasion of Sicily, and in 1947 he was awarded a Silver Medal of Military Valor.

Having been promoted to Vice Admiral (Ammiraglio di Divisione) in 1945, Leonardi was placed in reserve in the following year; in 1958, he was promoted to full Admiral (Ammiraglio di Squadra), Reserve. He died in Parma on 16 March 1984.
