= Operation Ladbroke =

Glider landing by Britain during the World War II

- Part of the Allied invasion of Sicily
- Sicily (pictured in red).
Date	9–10 July 1943
Location	Syracuse, Sicily 37°03′16″N 15°15′54″E
Result	British victory (Note: Although the 1st Airlanding Brigade could not hold onto the bridge after it had been captured. Their removal of the demolition charges prevented its destruction when the first units from the British 5th Infantry Division arrived.)

Belligerents
United Kingdom	Italy

Commanders and leaders
(United Kingdom) Philip Hicks	(Kingdom of Italy) Priamo Leonardi

Units involved
1st Airlanding Brigade	385th Coastal Battalion; 1st Battalion, 75th (Napoli) Infantry Regiment

Strength
2,075	Unknown

Casualties and losses
313 killed and 174 missing or wounded	321+ killed

Operation Ladbroke was a glider landing by British airborne troops during the Second World War near Syracuse, Sicily, that began on 9 July 1943 as part of Operation Husky, the Allied invasion of Sicily. The first Allied mission using large numbers of the aircraft, the operation was carried out from Tunisia by glider infantry of the British 1st Airlanding Brigade, commanded by Brigadier Philip Hicks, with a force of 136 Hadrians and eight Airspeed Horsas. The objective was to establish a large invasion force on the ground near the town of Syracuse, secure the Ponte Grande Bridge and ultimately take control of the city itself with its strategically vital docks, as a prelude to the full-scale invasion of Sicily.

En route to Sicily, sixty-five gliders released too early by the American towing aircraft crashed into the sea, drowning approximately 252 men. Of the remainder, only eighty-seven men arrived at the Pont Grande Bridge, although they successfully captured the bridge and held it beyond the time they were to be relieved. Finally, with their ammunition expended and only fifteen soldiers remaining unwounded, the Allied troops surrendered to Italian forces. The Italians, having gained control of the bridge, sought to destroy the structure, but were frustrated by troopers of the 1st Airlanding Brigade who had removed the previously attached explosive charges. Other troops from the brigade, who had landed elsewhere in Sicily, aided further by destroying communications links and capturing gun batteries.

== Background ==
By December 1942, with Allied forces advancing through Tunisia after landing there the month before in Operation Torch, the North African Campaign was coming to a close; with victory there imminent, discussions began among the Allies regarding the nature of their next objective. Many Americans argued for an immediate invasion of Northern France, while the British, as well as then-Lieutenant General Dwight D. Eisenhower, argued that the island of Sardinia was the best subsequent target of the Allied forces. In January 1943 the British Prime Minister Winston Churchill and U.S. President Franklin D. Roosevelt settled at the Casablanca Conference on the island of Sicily, whose invasion and occupation could potentially provide the Allies with Mediterranean shipping routes and airfields nearer to mainland Italy and Germany. The codename Operation Husky was decided upon for the Allied invasion of Sicily, and planning for Husky began in February. Initially the British Eighth Army, under the command of General Sir Bernard Montgomery, were to land on the south-eastern corner of the island and advance north to the port of Syracuse. Two days later the U.S. Seventh Army, commanded by Lieutenant General George S. Patton, would land on the western corner of the island and move towards the port of Palermo.

In March it was decided that the U.S. 82nd Airborne Division, under Major General Matthew Ridgway, and the British 1st Airborne Division, under Major-General George F. Hopkinson, would be dropped by parachute and glider just prior to the amphibious landings; they would land a few miles behind the beaches and neutralize their defenders, thereby aiding the landing of the Allied ground forces. However, in early May these directives were radically changed at the insistence of the Eighth Army commander, General Montgomery; he argued that with Allied forces landing separately at either end of the island, the defending Axis forces would have the opportunity to defeat each Allied army in turn before both could unite. Instead, the plans were altered to land both the Eighth and Seventh Armies simultaneously along a 100 miles (160 km) stretch of coastline on Sicily's south-eastern corner. At the same time, the plans for the two airborne divisions, the British 1st and U.S. 82nd, were also adjusted; Montgomery believed that the airborne troops should be landed near Syracuse, so that they could seize the valuable port. The commander of the 82nd Airborne Division Artillery, Brigadier General Maxwell D. Taylor, further asserted that dropping behind the island's beaches and overcoming its defences was not a suitable mission for the airborne troops, as they were only lightly armed and vulnerable to the 'friendly fire' of the planned Allied naval bombardment. In the revised blueprint for the airborne divisions, a reinforced regimental combat team (the 505th Parachute Infantry, under Colonel James M. Gavin, with the 3rd Battalion of the 504th PIR and numerous other units attached) from Major General Ridgway's U.S. 82nd Airborne Division would be dropped by parachute north-east of the port of Gela to block the movement of Axis reserves towards the Allied beachheads. Major General Hopkinson's British 1st Airborne Division was now to conduct three brigade-size airborne operations: the Ponte Grande road bridge south of Syracuse was to be captured by the 1st Airlanding Brigade, under Brigadier Philip Hicks, the port of Augusta was to be seized by Brigadier Ernest Down's 2nd Parachute Brigade, and finally the Primasole Bridge over the River Simeto was to be taken and secured by Brigadier Gerald Lathbury's 1st Parachute Brigade.

== Planning ==
Map showing the landing areas during the invasion of Sicily, July 1943.

As there were insufficient transport aircraft for all three brigades to conduct their operations simultaneously, it was decided that the first operation would be Ladbroke, whose objective was the capture of the Ponte Grande Bridge. The mission, under the command of Brigadier Philip Hicks, was conducted just prior to the amphibious landings, on the night of 9 July, while the remaining two operations took place on successive two nights. The 1st Airlanding Brigade was also given the additional tasks of capturing Syracuse harbour and the urban area that adjoined it, and either destroying or confiscating a coastal artillery battery that was in range of the amphibious landings. When training began for the operation, difficulties immediately arose. The original plan for the airborne operations had called for all three to employ parachutists, but in May Montgomery altered the plan; after determining that airborne troops would be at a considerable distance from Allied ground forces, he believed that the force sent to capture Syracuse would be served best by gliders in order to provide them with the maximum possible amount of firepower. His airborne advisor, Group Captain Cooper of the Royal Air Force, argued that a glider landing conducted at night with inexperienced aircrews was not practical, but the decision was left unchanged.

Montgomery's orders raised several issues, the first with the transport aircraft of the Troop Carrier Wings assigned to the airborne operations. When they had arrived in North Africa, it had been decided that the 52nd Troop Carrier Wing would operate with 1st Airborne Division and its counterpart, the 51st, with 82nd Airborne Division. A few weeks later this arrangement was switched, with the 52nd now operating with 82nd Airborne Division and the 51st with 1st Airborne Division; this seemed a logical decision, as each Wing had operational experience with the division it had been paired with. However, the decision to turn the Syracuse assault into a glider-based one was problematic; the 51st had practically no glider experience, whilst the 52nd had much more but was already training for a parachute-based mission. To switch both was impractical and would have led to a number of problems, which left 1st Airborne Division, and thus 1st Airlanding Brigade, with an inexperienced Troop Carrier Wing.

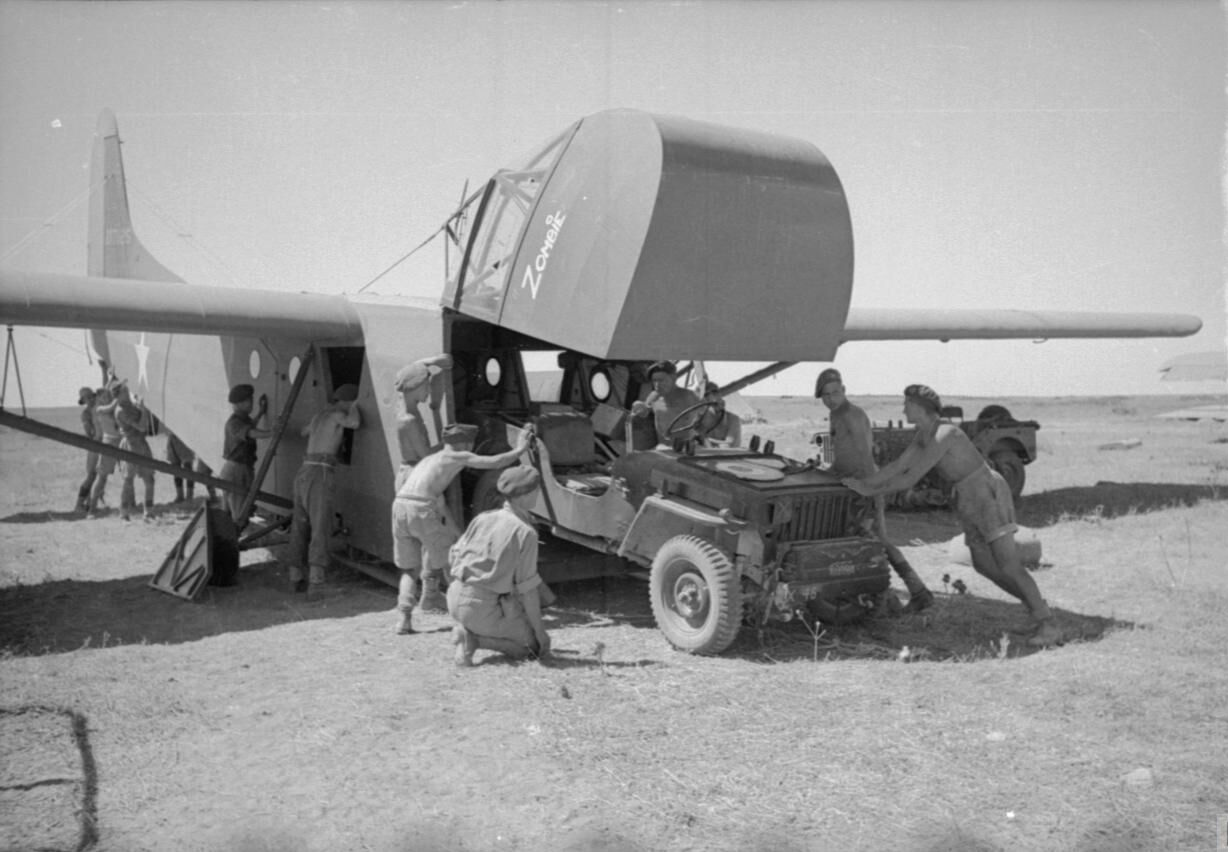
One of the 1st Airlanding Brigade's jeeps being loaded aboard a Waco Hadrian glider

=== Glider problems ===
Further problems were encountered with the gliders to be used in the operation, and the glider pilots themselves. Until a few months prior to the operation, there was a notable shortage of serviceable gliders in North Africa. In late March a small number of Wacos arrived at Accra on the Gold Coast, but pilots sent to ferry them to North Africa found that they were in poor condition. Due to neglect and the deleterious effects of tropical weather, the pilots were able to assemble only a small number of Wacos and fly them back on 22 April. On 23 April, a larger number of the American gliders began to arrive in North African ports, but were not immediately available for use as the crates holding them were unloaded haphazardly, instructions were often found to be missing, and those men assigned to assemble the gliders were often inexperienced. However, when the decision was made to conduct a glider-borne assault with 1st Airlanding Brigade, assembly was improved, and by 12 June 346 gliders had been put together and delivered to the Troop Carrier Wings. A small number of Horsa gliders were transported to North Africa for use by the brigade. Thirty took off from England and undertook a trip of approximately 1,500 miles (2,400 km) in Operation Turkey Buzzard. After attacks from Luftwaffe fighter patrols and experiencing often turbulent weather, a total of 27 Horsas were delivered to North Africa in time for the operation.

When sufficient gliders had arrived in North Africa, however, they were not all usable even in training; on 16 June, most of the gliders were grounded for repairs, and on 30 June, large numbers of them had developed weaknesses in their tail-wiring, necessitating another grounding period of three days. Given these problems and delays, 51st Troop Carrier Wing was not able to conduct a large-scale glider exercise until mid-June. On 14 June, fifty-four Wacos were flown over 70 miles (110 km) and then released to land at an airfield, and a larger exercise was conducted on 20 June; but even these limited exercises were unrealistic, as they were conducted in broad daylight. The British glider pilots themselves also caused difficulties; although there were a sufficient number of them to conduct the operation, they were highly inexperienced. Detached from the Glider Pilot Regiment for the operation, they had no experience with the Waco gliders and night operations involving them, as British doctrine had deemed such operations impossible. On average, the pilots had eight hours of flight experience in gliders. Few were rated as being 'operationally ready' and none had combat experience. Colonel George Chatterton, the commander of the Glider Pilot Regiment, had protested their participation as he believed they were entirely unfit for any operation. When the training period for the brigade ended with a total of two exercises completed, the glider pilots had an average of 4.5 hours training in flying the unfamiliar Waco, which included an average of 1.2 hours night flying.

=== 1st Airlanding Brigade ===
The units of the 1st Airlanding Brigade were: the 1st Battalion, Border Regiment; 2nd Battalion, South Staffordshire Regiment; 181st (Airlanding) Field Ambulance and 9th Field Company, Royal Engineers. The Staffords were tasked with securing the bridge and the area to the south, while the Borders were to capture Syracuse. For the mission the 1st Airlanding Brigade were allocated 136 Waco and eight Horsa gliders. With the shortage of space in the gliders—Wacos could only accommodate fifteen troops, half that of the Horsa, thus the whole brigade could not be deployed. (Note: For example, only six of the brigade's sixteen anti-tank guns were taken, with a similar reduction in mortars and no Vickers machine guns. The 181st Field Ambulance needed thirty-two Wacos but were only allocated six, and five of them failed to reach Sicily.) Six of the Horsas carrying 'A' and 'C' companies from the Staffords were scheduled to land at the bridge at 23:15 on 9 July in a coup-de-main operation. The remainder of the brigade would arrive at 01:15 on 10 July using a number of landing-zones between 1.5 and 3 miles (2.4 and 4.8 km) away, then converge on the bridge to reinforce the defence.

=== Italian forces ===
The Ponte Grande Bridge was immediately outside the area defended by the Italian 206th Coastal Division, which would oppose the British seaborne landing. The fortress commander was Rear Admiral Priamo Leonardi, with Colonel Mario Damiani in command of the army contingent. The Augusta-Syracuse Naval Fortress Area, which included the Coastal Division, was protected by six medium and six heavy coastal artillery batteries, with eleven additional dual-purpose coastal and anti-aircraft batteries, with six batteries only of anti-aircraft guns. Finally the Fortress contained an armoured train with four 120 mm guns. The army contingent was the 121st Coastal Defence Regiment, which included four battalions. There were also naval and air force battalions available, while the 54th Infantry Division "Napoli" was in a position to send reinforcements if required.

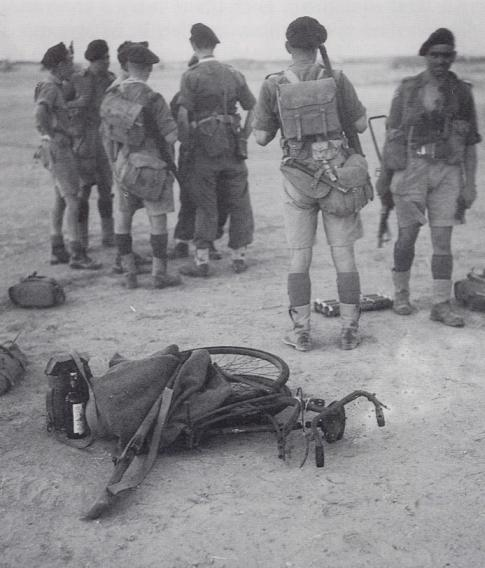
Men from the 1st Battalion, Border Regiment, on 9 July 1943, just prior to take off. Note the folding airborne bicycle.

== Mission ==
On 9 July, a contingent of 2,075 British troops, along with seven jeeps, six anti-tank guns and ten mortars, boarded their gliders in Tunisia and took off at 18:00, bound for Sicily. In the hours that preceded the landing, twelve Boeing B-17 and six Vickers Wellington equipped with radar jamming devices flew back and forth along the coast in the Siracusa-Licata sector; between 21:00 and 21:30, 55 Wellingtons of 205th Group carried out a diversionary bombing of the port and airport of Syracuse, causing a number of civilian and military casualties, including the commander of the Italian naval base, Commander Giuseppe Giannotti. 280 puppets dressed in paratrooper uniforms were launched north of the landing area, in order to deceive the Italian defense. En route, the gliders encountered strong winds, poor visibility and at times were subjected to anti-aircraft fire. To avoid gunfire and searchlights, pilots of the towing aircraft climbed higher or took evasive action. In the confusion surrounding these manoeuvres, some gliders were released too early and sixty-five of them crashed into the sea, drowning around 252 men. Of the remainder, only twelve landed in the right place. Another fifty-nine landed up to 25 miles (40 km) away while the remainder were either shot down or failed to release and returned to Tunisia. About 200 American paratroopers, having been mistakenly parachuted in the area assigned to the Eighth Army, were captured by the Italian 146th Coastal Regiment (206th Coastal Division) in the early hours of 10 July.

Only one Horsa with a platoon of infantry from the Staffords landed near the bridge. Its commander, Lieutenant Withers, divided his men into two groups, one of which swam across the river and took up position on the opposite bank. Thereafter the bridge was captured following a simultaneous assault from both sides. The Italian defenders from the 120th Coastal Infantry Regiment abandoned their pillboxes on the north bank. (Note: Coastal units were second line formations, usually made up from men in their forties and fifties, and were intended to perform labouring or other second line duties. Recruited from the local population, their officers were mostly men who had retired and had been called up again. Their morale was low, not least because of the second rate equipment and weapons they had been issued. It had been intended to improve their armaments with equipment seized from the recently disbanded Vichy French army, but when the arms arrived in Sicily, they had often been made unusable and had the wrong type or no ammunition at all.)

The British platoon then dismantled some demolition charges that had been fitted to the bridge and dug-in to wait for reinforcement or relief. Another Horsa landed roughly 200 yards (180 m) from the bridge but exploded on landing, killing all on board. Three of the other Horsas carrying the coup-de-main party landed within 2 miles (3.2 km) of the bridge—their occupants eventually finding their way to the site. Reinforcements began to arrive at the bridge, but by 06:30 they numbered only eighty-seven men.

Elsewhere, about 150 men landed at Cape Murro di Porco and captured a radio station. Based on a warning of imminent glider landings transmitted by the station's previous occupants, the local Italian commander ordered a counter-attack but his troops failed to receive his message. The scattered nature of the landings now worked in the Allies' favour as they were able to cut all telephone wires in the immediate area. The glider carrying the brigade deputy commander, Colonel O. L. Jones, landed beside an Italian coastal artillery battery; at daylight the staff officers and radio operators attacked and destroyed the battery's five guns and their ammunition dump. Other isolated groups of Allied soldiers tried to aid their comrades, assaulting Italian defences and targeting reinforcements. Another attack by a group of paratroopers on three 149/35 mm Italian coastal batteries failed, and the batteries were able to open fire on Allied landing craft and troops at 6:15 on 10 July. At 9:15, the 1st Battalion of the Italian 75th Infantry Regiment ("Napoli" Division) captured another 160 American paratroopers on the Palazzolo Acreide–Syracuse road. Another group of paratroopers attacked an Italian patrol led by Major Paoli, commander of the 126th Artillery Group; Paoli was killed and his unit fell in disarray, and was thus unable to intervene in the later fight against British tanks near the bridge.

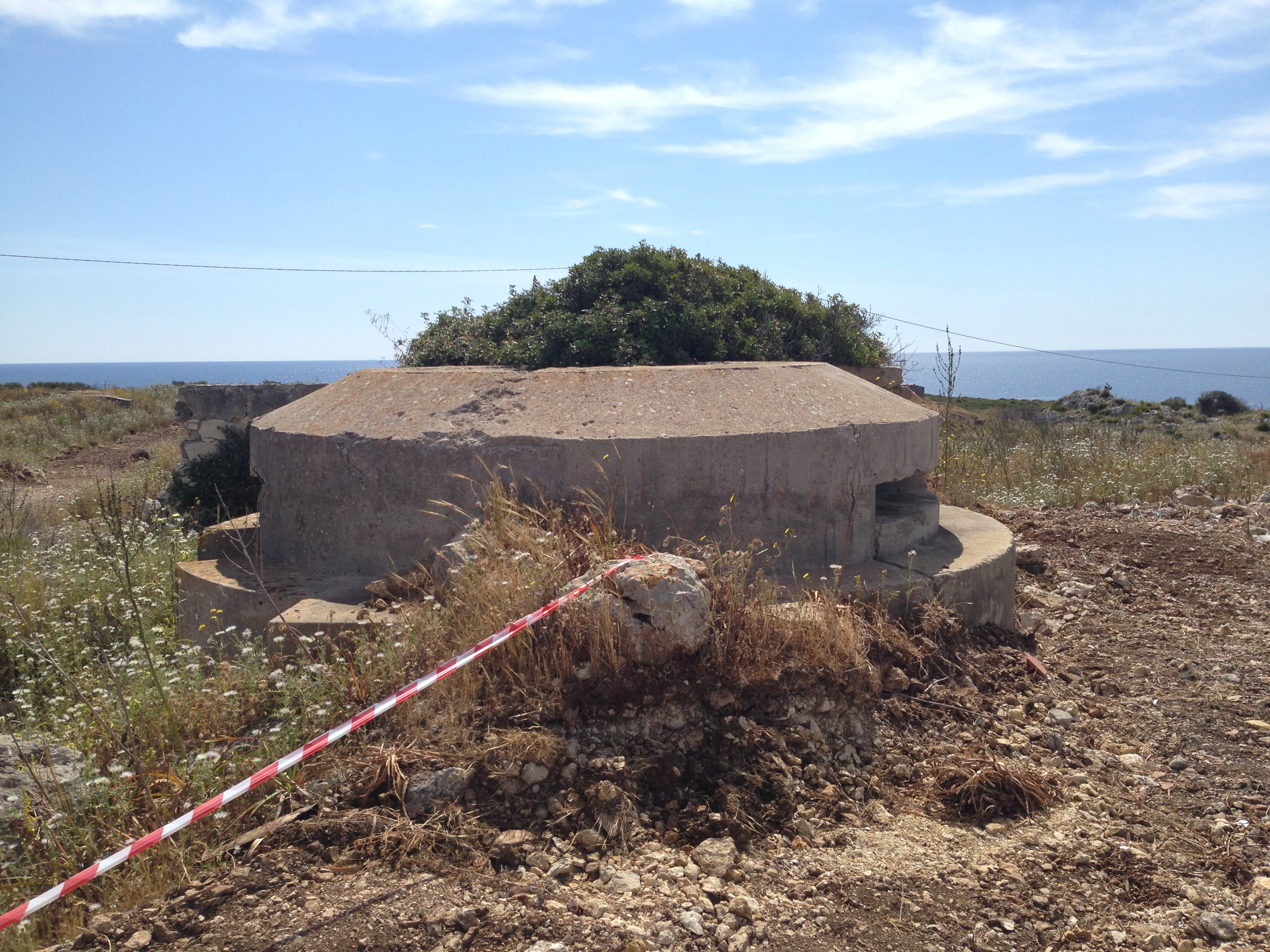
Remains of the Lamba Doria coastal battery, captured by 250 British commandos after about two hours of fighting, in the night of 10 July 1943.

The first counterattack on the bridge was by two companies of Italian sailors, who were repulsed by the British. As the Italians responded to the Allied landings, they gathered more troops and brought up artillery and mortars to bombard the Allied-controlled Pont Grande Bridge. The British defenders came under attack from the Italians while the expected British 5th Infantry Division relief did not appear at 10:00 as planned. At 11:30 the Italian 385th Coastal Battalion arrived at the bridge, followed soon afterward by the 1st Battalion, 75th (Napoli) Infantry Regiment. The Italians were positioned to attack the bridge from three sides. By 14:45 there were only fifteen British troops defending the bridge that had not been killed or wounded (four officers and eleven soldiers). At 15:30, with their ammunition consumed, the British stopped fighting. Some men on the south side of the bridge escaped into the countryside, but the rest became prisoners of war. With the bridge back in Italian hands, the first unit from 5th Infantry Division, the 2nd Battalion, Royal Scots Fusiliers, of 17th Infantry Brigade, arrived at the bridge at 16:15 and mounted a successful counter-attack, which had been made possible by the prior removal of demolition charges from the bridge, preventing its destruction by the Italians. The 1st Battalion of the 75th Infantry Regiment, having no artillery, was unable to oppose the British tanks and had to retreat after suffering heavy losses. The survivors from the 1st Airlanding Brigade took no further part in the fighting and were withdrawn back to North Africa on 13 July. During the landings, the losses by 1st Airlanding Brigade were the most severe of all British units involved. The casualties amounted to 313 killed and 174 missing or wounded. Fourteen accompanying glider pilots were killed, and eighty-seven were missing or wounded. On the Italian side, the 385th Coastal Battalion lost 223 men killed, plus at least 98 more men from other units.

== Aftermath ==
After an enquiry into the problems with the airborne missions in Sicily, the British Army and Royal Air Force submitted recommendations in the aftermath of Operation Ladbroke. Aircrew were to be trained in parachute and glider operations, and pathfinders were to be landed before the main force, to set out their beacons. The landing plan was simplified with complete brigades landing on a drop zone, instead of the smaller battalion landing areas used on Sicily. Gliders were no longer released at night while still over water, and their landing zones would be large enough to accommodate the aircraft with room to spare. Following a friendly fire incident over an Allied convoy, more training was given to ship's crews in aircraft recognition; Allied aircraft were also painted with three large white stripes. Training for pilots of the Glider Pilot Regiment was increased, and improvements to the gliders were implemented, including better inter-aircraft communication. To provide another method of delivering jeeps and artillery by air, the Royal Air Force started experimenting with how to use parachutes to drop them into combat, the jeeps and guns being carried in aircraft's bomb bays. A second Royal Air Force transport group, No. 46, was formed and equipped solely with Douglas Dakotas, instead of the mixture of aircraft in No. 38 Group. Together, the Royal Air Force groups were capable of supplying eighty-eight Albermarles, eighty-eight Stirlings, thirty-six Halifaxes and 150 Dakotas, a total of 362 planes which did not include aircraft held as reserves. (Note: While an improvement of what went before the total of 362 is only a fraction of the 1,166 C-47s in the American transport fleet. The lack of transport aircraft hampered every British airborne operation of the war. Nonetheless, since 1941 following an Air Ministry order, many Royal Air Force bombers had equipment fitted to tow gliders; as a result, Albemarle, Halifax and Stirling bombers were able to conduct parachute operations. Even so, it was the Commander-in-Chief of RAF Bomber Command Arthur Harris, who refused to divert Avro Lancasters from the strategic bombing campaign, for the transportation of troops.)

== Bibliography ==
- Cole, Howard N (1963). On wings of healing: the story of the Airborne Medical Services 1940–1960. Edinburgh: William Blackwood. OCLC 29847628.
- Eisenhower, Dwight D. (1948). Crusade in Europe. New York: Doubleday. OCLC 21560848.
- Harclerode, Peter (2005). Wings of War – Airborne Warfare 1918–1945. London: Weidenfeld & Nicolson. ISBN 0-304-36730-3.
- Huston, James A. (1998). Out of The Blue – US Army Airborne Operations In World War II. West Lafayette, IN: Purdue University Press. ISBN 1-55753-148-X.
- Jowett, Philip S. (2001). The Italian Army 1940–45. Men at arms. Vol. 3: Italy 1943–45. Oxford, UK: Osprey Publishing. ISBN 1-85532-866-6.
- Lake, Jon (1999). Halifax Squadrons of World War 2. Combat Aircraft. Vol. 14. Oxford, UK: Osprey Publishing. ISBN 1-85532-892-5.
- Lloyd, Alan (1982). The Gliders: The Story of Britain's Fighting Gliders and the Men who Flew Them. London, United Kingdom: Corgi. ISBN 0-552-12167-3.
- Mitcham, Samuel W; Von Stauffenberg, Friedrich (2007). The Battle of Sicily: How the Allies Lost Their Chance for Total Victory. Stackpole Military History Series. Mechanicsburg, PA: Stackpole Books. ISBN 978-0-8117-3403-5.
- Mrazek, James (2011). Airborne Combat: Axis and Allied Glider Operations in World War II. Military History Series. Mechanicsburg, PA: Stackpole Books. ISBN 978-0-8117-0808-1.
- Nigl, Alfred J (2007). Silent Wings Savage Death. Santa Anna, CA: Graphic Publishers. ISBN 978-1-882824-31-1.
- Otway, Lieutenant-Colonel T.B.H. (1990). The Second World War 1939–1945 Army – Airborne Forces. London: Imperial War Museum. ISBN 0-901627-57-7.
- Thompson, Major-General Julian (1990). Ready for Anything: The Parachute Regiment at War. Fontana, CA: Fontana. ISBN 0-00-637505-7.
- Tugwell, Maurice (1971). Airborne to Battle: A History of Airborne Warfare, 1918–1971. London: Kimber. ISBN 0-7183-0262-1.
- Warren, John C. (1955). Airborne Missions in the Mediterranean 1942–1945. Air University, Maxwell AFB: US Air Force Historical Research Agency. OCLC 224073010.
