= Glider Pilot Regiment =

- Cap badge of the Glider Pilot Regiment.
- Active: 21 December 1941 – 1 September 1957
- Country: United Kingdom
- Branch: British Army
- Type: Army Aviation
- Role: Air transport and airborne infantry
- Size: Brigade
- Part of: Army Air Corps 1942–1949; Glider Pilot and Parachute Corps (1949–1957)
- Mottos: Nihil est Impossibilis "Nothing is Impossible"
- Engagements: Operation Freshman; Operation Turkey Buzzard; Operation Ladbroke; Operation Fustian; Operation Husky; Capture of the Caen canal and Orne river bridges Operation Tonga; Operation Market Garden; Operation Varsity; Operation Dragoon

Commanders
- Colonel Commandant: The Rt Hon Alan Francis (Brooke), 1st Viscount Alanbrooke, KG (1942-)

Insignia
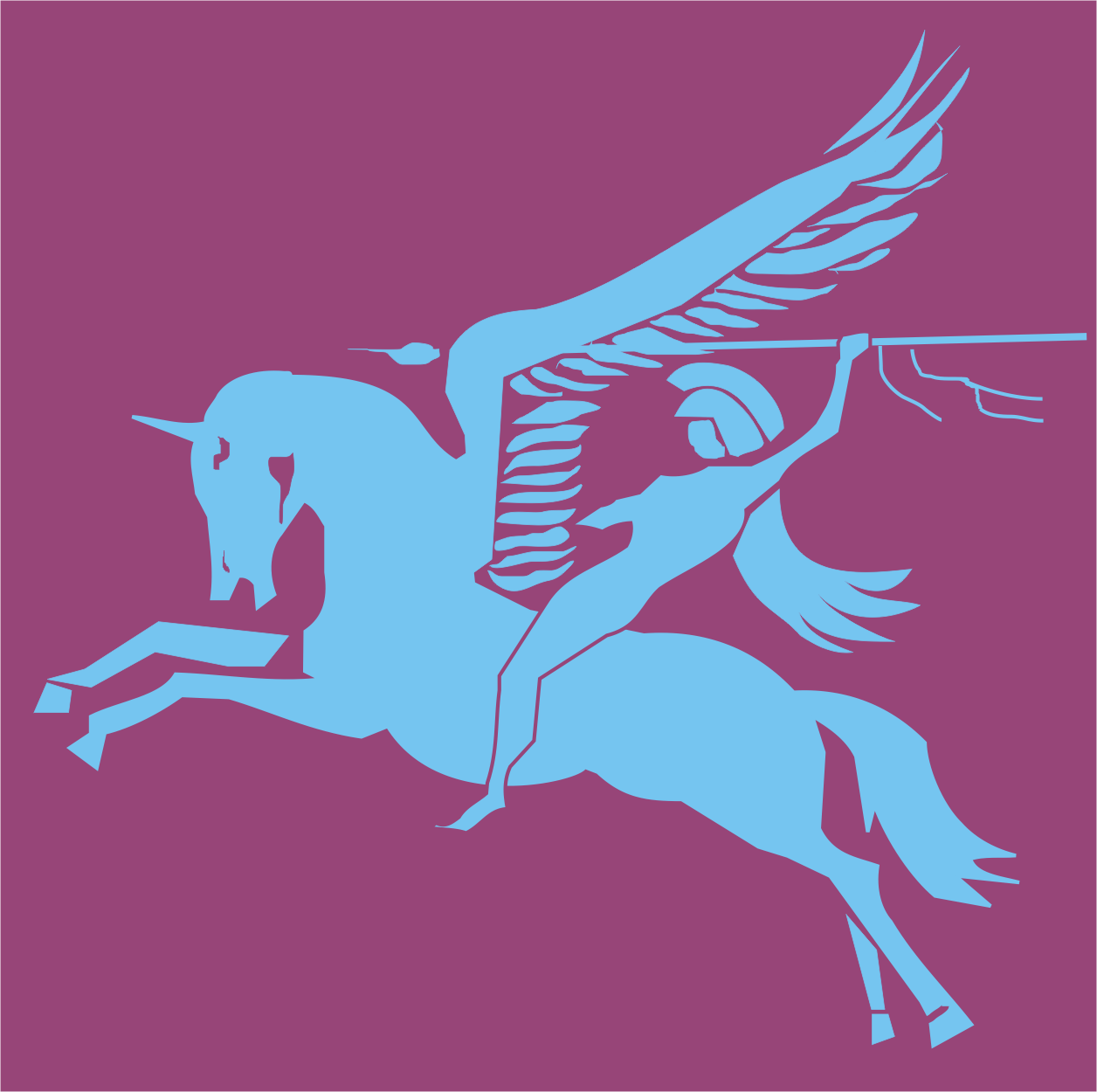
- Emblem of the British Airborne Forces

The Glider Pilot Regiment was a British airborne forces unit of the Second World War, which was responsible for crewing the British Army's military gliders and saw action in the European theatre in support of Allied airborne operations. Established during the war in 1942, the regiment was disbanded in 1957. During its short existence, the unit gained the dual distinction of being both the shortest-lived regiment in British Army history and the unit that accrued the highest casualty rate per head.

== Formation ==
The German military was one of the pioneers of the use of airborne formations, conducting several successful airborne operations during the Battle of France in 1940, including the Battle of Fort Eben-Emael. Impressed by the success of German airborne operations, the Allied governments decided to form their own airborne formations. This decision would eventually lead to the creation of two British airborne divisions, as well as a number of smaller units. The British airborne establishment began development on 22 June 1940, when the new British Prime Minister, Winston Churchill, directed a memorandum to the War Office to investigate the possibility of creating a corps of 5,000 parachute troops.

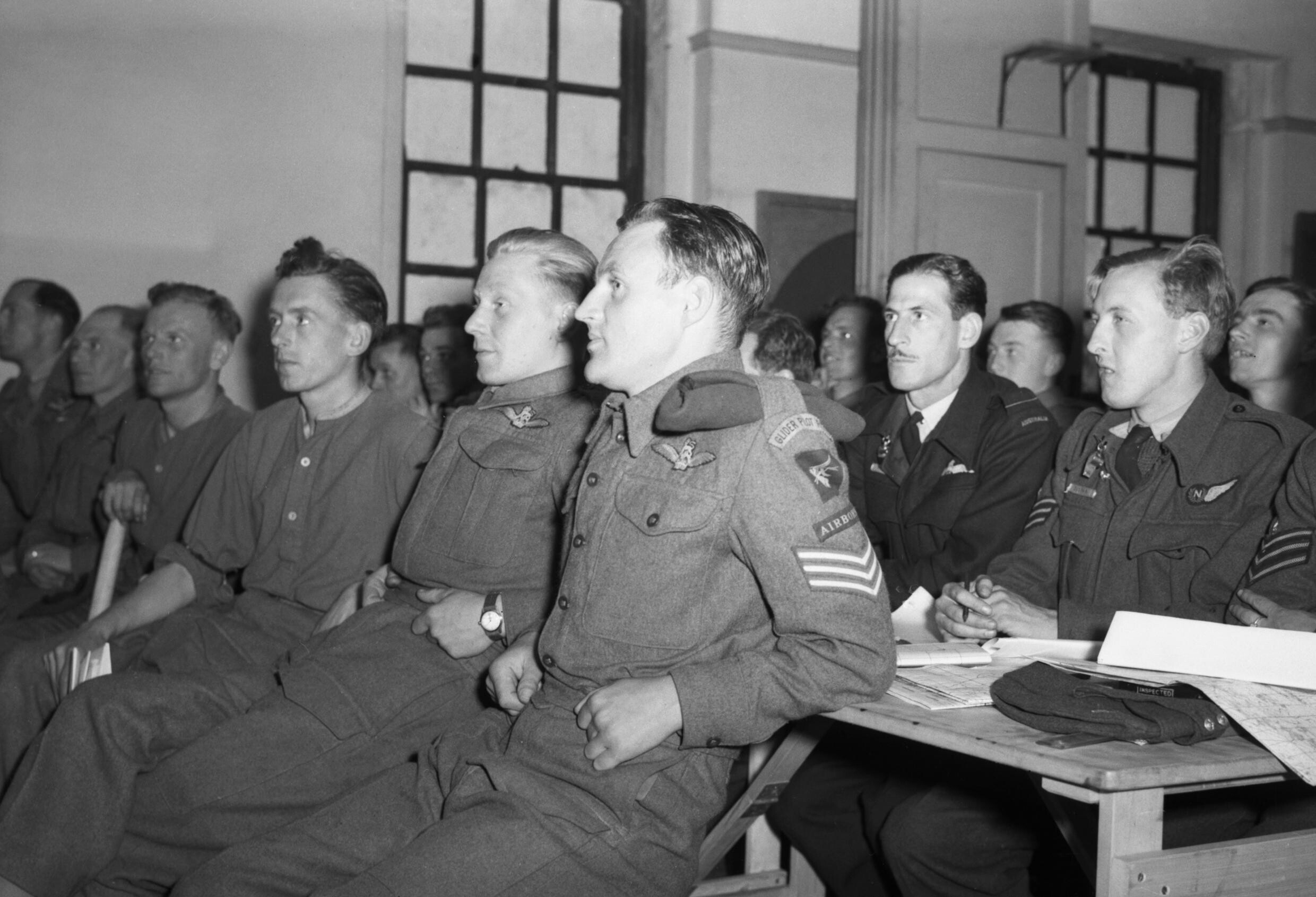
Glider pilots of the 6th Airborne Division and RAF crews are briefed at RAF Harwell for the D-Day invasion, 5 June 1944.

On 21 June 1941, the Central Landing Establishment was formed at Ringway airfield near Manchester; although tasked primarily with training parachute troops, it was also directed to investigate the possibilities of using gliders to transport troops into battle. It had been decided that the Royal Air Force (RAF) and the British Army would co-operate in forming the airborne establishment. Squadron Leader Louis Strange and Major J.F. Rock were tasked with gathering together potential glider pilots and forming a glider unit; this was achieved by searching for members of the armed forces who had pre-war experience of flying gliders, or were interested in learning to do so.

The two officers and their newly formed unit were provided with four obsolescent Armstrong Whitworth Whitley bombers and a small number of Tiger Moth and Avro 504 biplanes, for towing purposes. Around this time the War Office and Air Ministry began to draw up specifications for several types of military gliders to be used by the unit. The resulting gliders were the General Aircraft Hotspur, General Aircraft Hamilcar, Airspeed Horsa and the Slingsby Hengist. These designs would take some time to be implemented and produced, however, and for the time being the fledgling unit was forced to improvise.

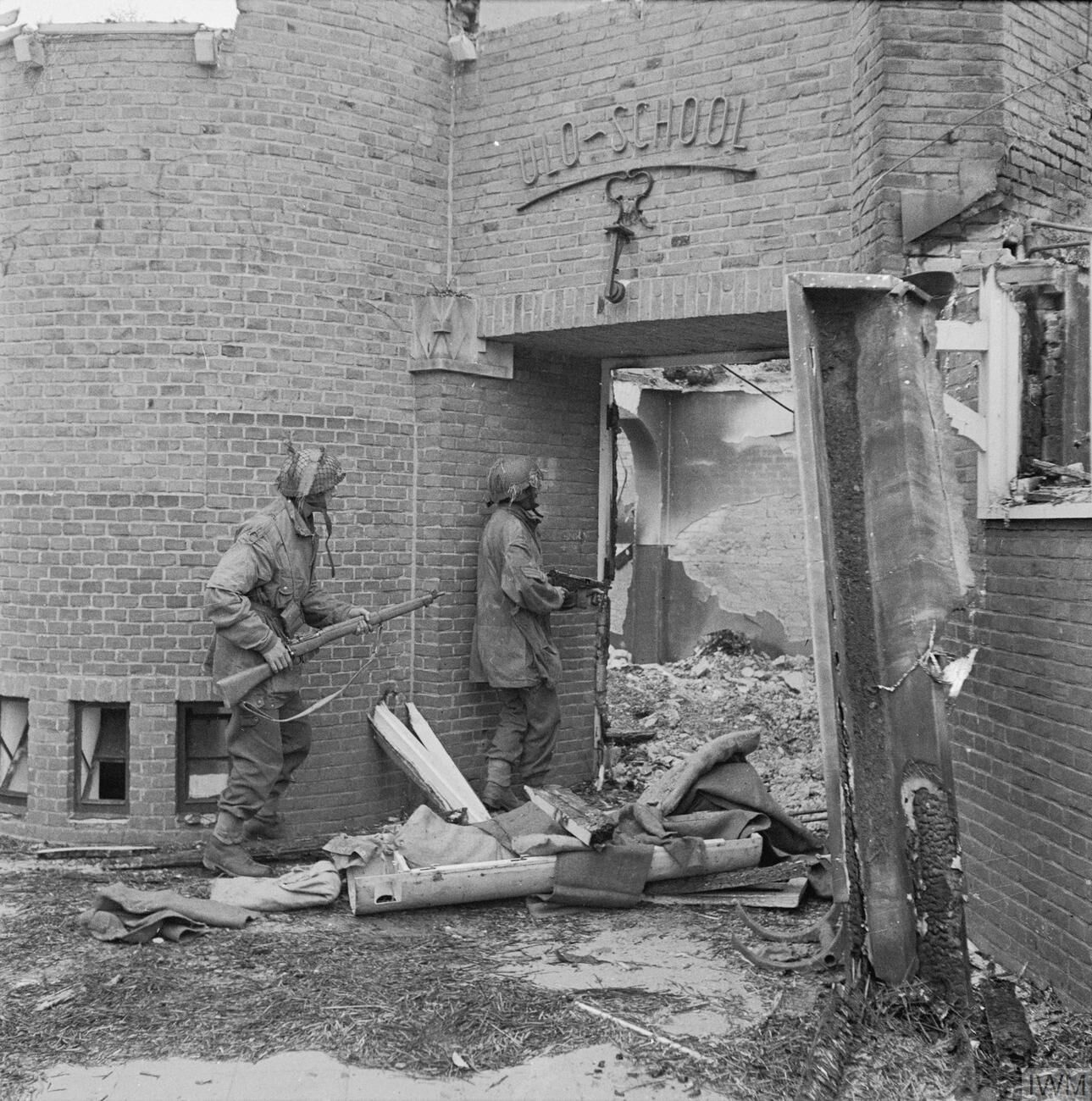
Two men of the Glider Pilot Regiment search a ruined school for German snipers during Operation Market Garden, 20 September 1944. After landing, glider pilots were expected to fight as infantry.

A Glider Training Squadron was formed, and the first test-flights were conducted using Swallow light aircraft which had their propellers removed to simulate the flight characteristics of a glider; they were towed by the Whitleys using tow-ropes of varying number and length for experimentation purposes. Appeals were made throughout the United Kingdom for civilian gliders to be donated to the squadron, and the first four arrived in August 1941; three of them had been manufactured in pre-war Germany. Soon several more were donated, and these were put to use training instructors, glider pilots and newly formed ground crews. Accidents were quite frequent in these early months, primarily due to the hemp tow-ropes breaking during flight; these problems were only solved with the introduction of nylon tow-ropes imported from the USA. The first demonstration of the squadron's abilities took place on 26 September, when Prince George, Duke of Kent witnessed a demonstration of the fledgling airborne establishment's capabilities: four parachute-drops were conducted, and then two gliders were towed by civilian aircraft. This was followed on 26 October by a night exercise being conducted by the squadron, with two Avro 504s towing four gliders, and on 13 December five gliders were towed to Tatton Park, where they landed alongside sixteen parachutists dropped from two Whitley bombers.

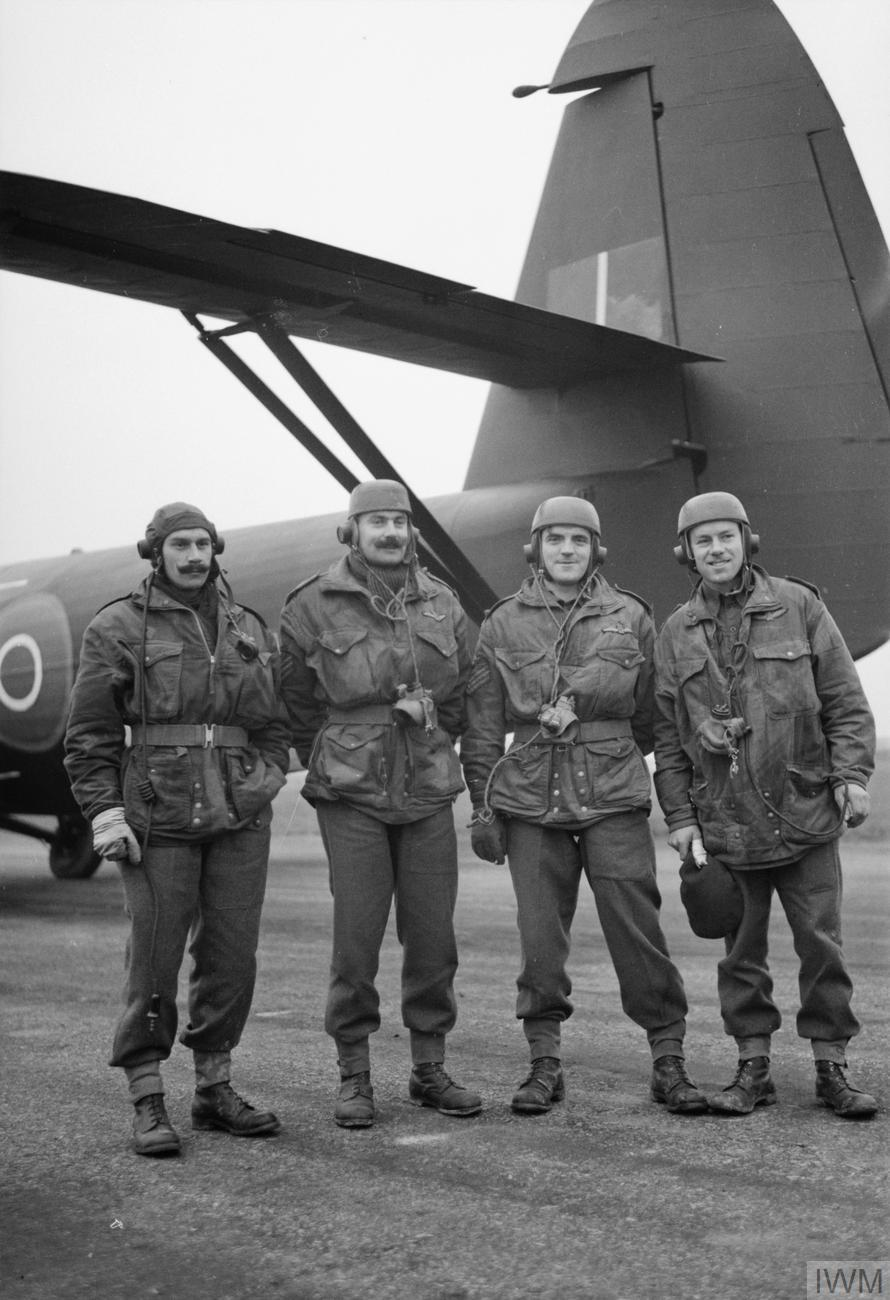
Glider pilots pose in front of a Horsa glider, 11 December 1944. From left to right: Lt J. F. Hubble; S/Sgt B. L. Morgan; S/Sgt J. L. Crone; Sgt R. Biagott.

There was a certain carefree atmosphere in the squadron in the first few months of its existence; new recruits were not obliged to pass a medical test to join the squadron, and it attracted a number of adventurous-minded men with a passion for flying. That one sergeant claimed to have flown a Messerschmitt during the Spanish Civil War, suggested that volunteers' accounts of their past flying experience were not always subject to significant scrutiny with regard to accuracy, let alone questions of loyalty. These first pilots had been volunteers recruited from all branches of the armed forces, primarily the Army, but as the squadron began to conduct training exercises, arguments broke out between the RAF and the Army over the pilots. In the view of the RAF, gliders were aircraft and therefore came under their jurisdiction and should be controlled by them; the Army argued that as the glider pilots would subsequently be fighting alongside the troops they had transported, they should come under Army control. After much debate, a compromise was brokered between the two services: the pilots would be recruited from the Army but would be trained by the RAF.

Volunteers were sought from the Army and had to be passed by RAF selection procedures before entering the full 11-week RAF Elementary Flying Training Course training on Tiger Moth and Miles Magister powered aircraft. Once qualified they were given further training on gliders: another 12-week course to qualify on the General Aircraft Hotspur. After a while they would then go to a Heavy Glider Conversion Unit for a six-week course so they were qualified for the Airspeed Horsa.

== Higher formations ==
In 1942 the Glider Pilot Regiment came under a newly formed administrative corps, the Army Air Corps, alongside the Parachute Regiment and wartime Special Air Service, and the air observation post squadrons of the Royal Artillery. In 1949, the AAC was broken up and the regiment formed part of the Glider Pilot and Parachute Corps. In 1957 the Glider Pilot Regiment and the air observation post squadrons of the Royal Artillery amalgamated to form the current Army Air Corps.

== Regimental Association ==
Veterans of the regiment were represented by the Glider Pilot Regimental Association. The association published a journal entitled "The Eagle", operated a benevolent fund and organised pilgrimages to locations where the regiment had fought, particularly Normandy and Arnhem. Due to the declining number of veterans and lack of external support, the members of the association voted in favour of winding it down. It closed on 31 December 2016.

Family members of veterans, who had previously been permitted to join the association as associate members, gathered together to form a civilian society named The Glider Pilot Regiment Society which officially opened on 1 January 2017 with the approval of a large number of veterans. The objective of the society is to preserve and promote the heritage of The Glider Pilot Regiment through education and engagement and create a network for veterans of the Glider Pilot Regiment and their families to engage with one another. The society produces a magazine entitled "Glider Pilot's Notes", arranges trips for veterans and organises events every year to mark key anniversaries relating to the regiment's history.

== Battle honours ==
The regiment was awarded the following battle honours for its service during the Second World War:

- Landing in Sicily
- Sicily 1943
- Normandy Landing
- Pegasus Bridge
- Merville Battery
- Southern France
- Arnhem 1944
- Rhine
- North-West Europe campaign of 1944–45

In 2025 a D-Day memorial sculpture to the 6th Airborne Division, No. 38 Group RAF, and the Glider Pilot Regiment, inspired by the form of the fuselage of the wooden Horsa gliders was unveiled on the site of the former RAF Harwell.

== See also ==
- The Parachute Regiment – the UK's other airborne infantry
- Assault Glider Trust
