= Operation Slapstick =

WW2 British military operation during the Allied invasion of Italy, 1943

- Part of the Allied invasion of Italy
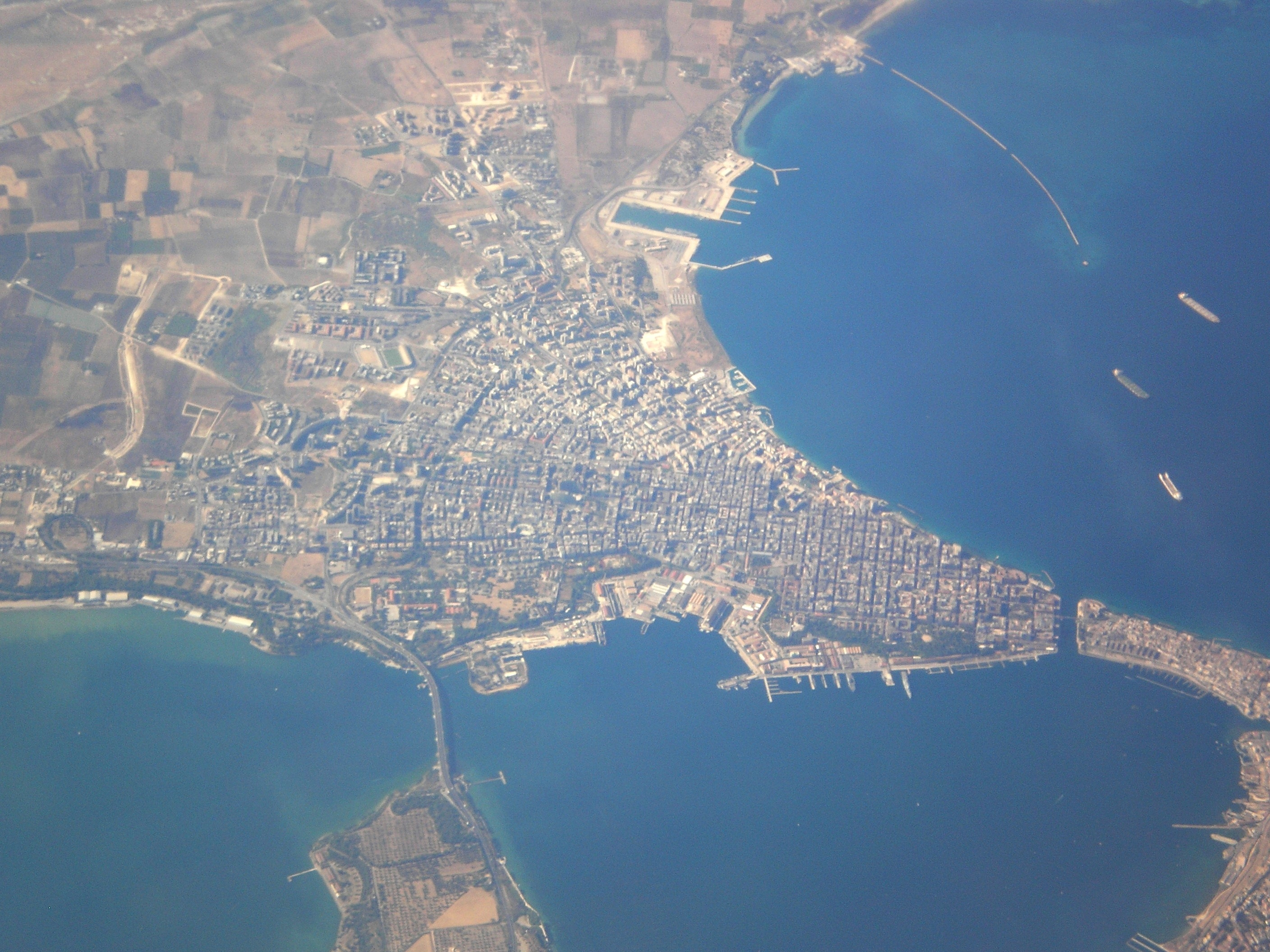
- Aerial view of Taranto.
Date	9 September 1943
Location	Taranto, Italy 40°28′15.53″N 17°14′10.23″E
Result	British success

Belligerents
United Kingdom	Germany

Commanders and leaders
(United Kingdom) George Hopkinson † (United Kingdom) Ernest Down	(Nazi Germany) Richard Heidrich

Units involved
1st Airborne Division; 12th Cruiser Squadron	1st Parachute Division

Casualties and losses
British Army: 58 dead 154 wounded Royal Navy: 48 dead HMS Abdiel sunk	None during initial landing
- The Field Ambulance units in the division treated 2,150 casualties, between the landing and being withdrawn. Not all of these were from the 1st Airborne Division.

Operation Slapstick was the code name for a British landing from the sea at the Italian port of Taranto during the Second World War. The operation, one of three landings during the Allied invasion of Italy in September 1943, was undertaken by airborne troops of the British 1st Airborne Division, commanded by Major-General George Hopkinson.

Planned at short notice, the mission followed an offer by the Italian government to open the ports of Taranto and Brindisi on the heel of Italy to the Allies. The airborne division was selected to undertake the mission, but at the time they were located in North Africa. A shortage of transport aircraft meant the division could not land in their traditional way by parachute and glider, and all the landing craft in the area were already allocated to the other landings: Operation Avalanche at Salerno on the western coast, and Operation Baytown at Calabria. Instead, the division had to be transported across the Mediterranean by ships of the Royal Navy. The landing was unopposed and the airborne division successfully captured the ports of Taranto, and later Brindisi on the Adriatic coast in working order.

The only German forces in the area were elements of the 1st Parachute Division (1. Fallschirmjäger Division), (Note: On 9 September HQ 1st Parachute Division had under command its 1st Parachute Regiment (less a battalion) plus a battalion of the 4th Parachute Regiment. Its 3rd and 4th Parachute Regiments (less detachment) were in Calabria under command of 26th Panzer Division while the 3rd Battalion of the 1st Parachute Regiment was in Naples under command of the Hermann Göring Division.) which engaged the advancing British in ambushes and at roadblocks during a fighting withdrawal north. Eventually, by the end of September, the British 1st Airborne Division advanced 125 miles (201 km) to Foggia. Reinforcements from two infantry divisions had by then been landed behind them, which allowed the airborne troops to be withdrawn to Taranto. Soon after, the division, minus the 2nd Parachute Brigade, sailed for England in preparation for Operation Overlord, the invasion of Normandy.

== Background ==
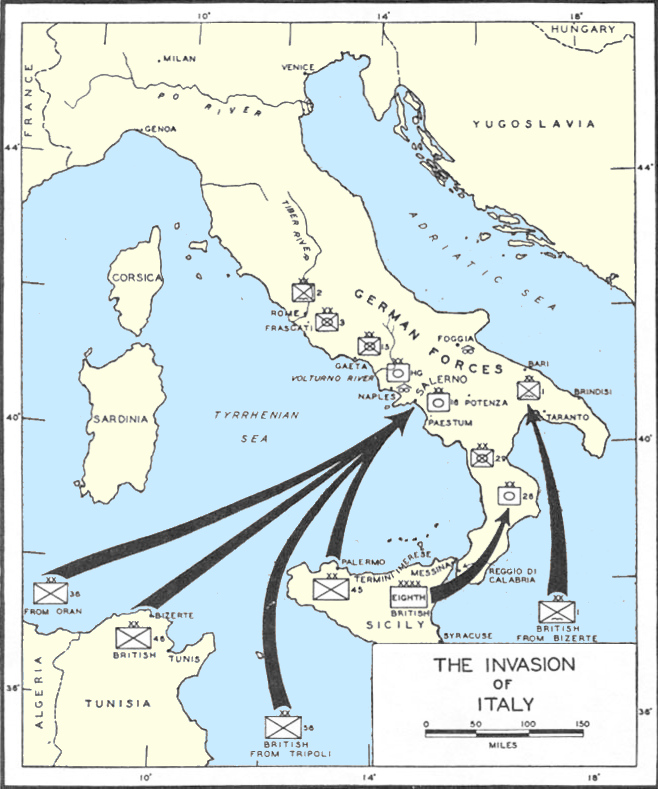
Locations of the Allied invasion of Italy.

In May 1943, the Axis powers of Nazi Germany and Fascist Italy were defeated in the North African Campaign. Two months later, the Allied powers of Great Britain and the United States successfully launched their invasion of Sicily, codenamed Operation Husky. The island being completely occupied by the end of August, the Allies next turned their attention to the invasion of Italy.

On 3 September 1943, the British Eighth Army, under the command of General Sir Bernard Montgomery, crossed the Strait of Messina from Sicily and landed in Calabria during Operation Baytown to seize the ports of Reggio and San Giovanni. The main invasion was planned for 9 September, with the U.S. Fifth Army, commanded by Lieutenant General Mark Clark, landing at Salerno on the western coast in Operation Avalanche, with Naples as their immediate objective. The Allies hoped that the invasion would persuade the Italian forces to surrender. If they did, the five Italian divisions in France and the twenty-nine in the Balkans would have to be replaced by German formations. Also, if the Germans then decided to continue the fight in Italy, they would have to redeploy some of their troops engaged on the Eastern Front or on occupation duties in France.

During secret surrender negotiations with the Allies in early September, the Italian government offered to open the ports of Taranto and Brindisi on the eastern coast. German forces in that area were very weak and would be expected to withdraw rather than fight if the Allies landed there. General Dwight D. Eisenhower, the Supreme Allied Commander in the Mediterranean, quickly planned a third landing, codenamed Slapstick, to take advantage of the offer.

Slapstick was in part an operation of deception, to divert German forces away from the main Allied landings at Salerno on the same day, while also attempting to capture Taranto and Brindisi intact. The main value of Taranto was its large port. Its seizure would, with the expected capture of Naples in the west by the Americans, give the Allies supply points on both Italian coasts.

This military operation had a major political role, since the leaders of the government, including King Vittorio Emanuele III and his family, and Prime Minister Badoglio, fled from Rome to Brindisi after the surrender. Brindisi at the time was controlled only by the Italian Army, but its quick occupation by British troops secured the safety of the Italian leaders and allowed the declaration of war by Italy against Germany.

=== Taranto ===
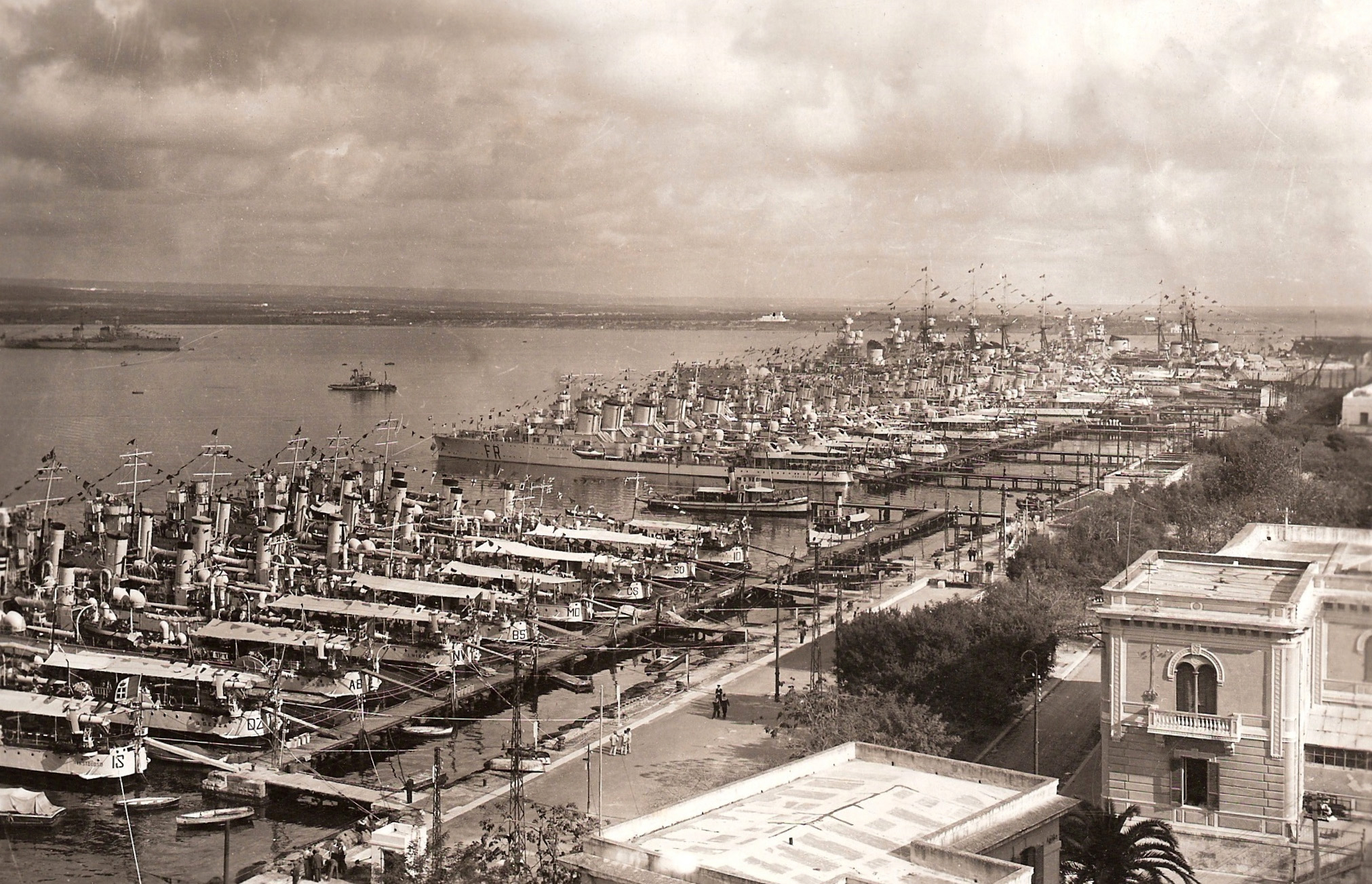
Taranto naval base in the 1930s.

Taranto is the capital city of the Province of Taranto in the region of Apulia and has a large harbor. It includes the two islets of St. Peter and St. Paul, which protect the bay, called the Mar Grande ("Big Sea"), where the commercial port is located. After the unification of Italy, Taranto became the main base of the Italian Navy. The military port was located in another bay, the Mar Piccolo. In November 1940, the Royal Navy attacked the naval base in Taranto, sinking some Italian battleships.

== Prelude ==
=== German forces ===
The German High Command fully expected Italy to surrender and, in preparation, had secretly established a new Army group headquarters commanded by Generalfeldmarschall Erwin Rommel at Munich. Rommel would have six divisions transferred from the Eastern Front, two divisions from France that had just been reformed, and two parachute divisions based in Germany in his new command. However, a Russian offensive in the east prevented the release of all the units promised. Adolf Hitler came to the conclusion that, without the backing of the Italian Army, it would be impossible for the Germans to defend the whole of Italy.

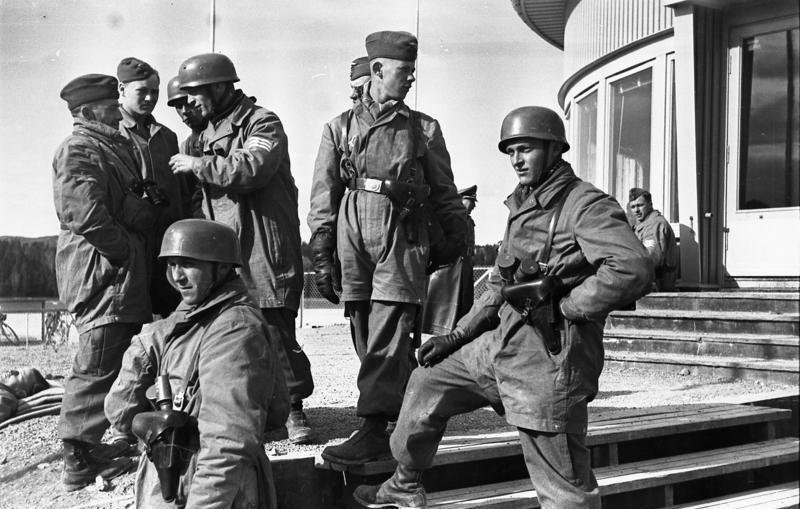
German paratroops (Fallschirmjäger) of Fallschirmjäger-Regiment 1.

In Italy, German Generalfeldmarschall Albert Kesselring, unaware of what was happening in Germany, had been building up the strength of his forces. He was aided in this by the escape from Sicily of three divisions, which managed to cross the Strait of Messina without serious loss of men or equipment. In August, five infantry and two panzer divisions moved into northern Italy. After the loss of Sicily, Hitler amended the German plans, deciding to hold the Salerno-Naples area with five infantry divisions, while the 1st Parachute Division was ordered to the Apulia region.

Commanded by Generalmajor Richard Heidrich, the 1st Parachute Division consisted of the 1st, 3rd and 4th Parachute Regiments, with an artillery regiment, tank-destroyer, anti-aircraft, and engineer battalions, and other support units. The division was the successor of the original German airborne force, the 7th Air Division, and was highly experienced. It had spearheaded the German invasion in the west in 1940, and fought in the battles of Greece and Crete, and in the Soviet Union. Withdrawn from the Soviet Union in 1943, the division had already fought against British paratroops during operations in Sicily. However, on 9 September only three combat battalions and the headquarters were in Apulia.

=== British forces ===
Plans were formulated on 6 September to transport the British 1st Airborne Division to Taranto from their base in North Africa. They would take advantage of the Italian surrender to capture the port and establish anti-aircraft defences. What was left of the Italian fleet still using the harbour was expected to have left beforehand. The Allies believed that the division would face only minimal opposition and would be able to overcome any resistance with the limited naval support available, as Taranto was outside the range of Allied fighter aircraft based in Sicily.

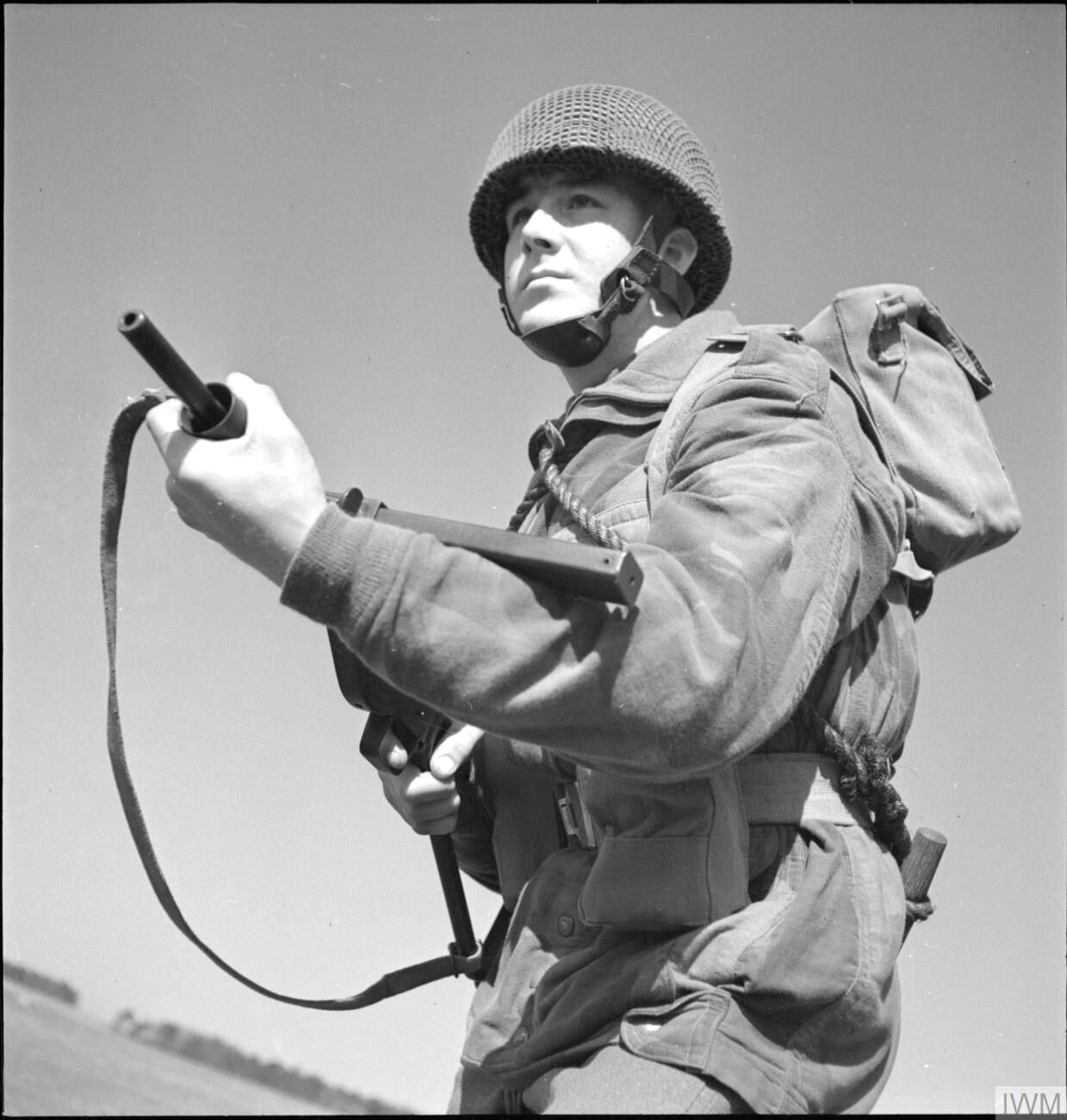
British paratrooper armed with Sten gun, May 1943.

Although it had been formed in October 1941, the British 1st Airborne Division, commanded by Major-General George Hopkinson, had never before fought as a complete division. The only units with any combat experience were the 1st Parachute Brigade, which had fought with distinction as an independent brigade in North Africa and in Operation Fustian during the Allied invasion of Sicily, and the 1st Airlanding Brigade, understrength with only two battalions, which had also fought in Sicily during Operation Ladbroke. Both brigades had suffered heavy casualties in Sicily and were in no condition to undertake any further assault landings. Of the division's other brigades, the 2nd and 4th Para Brigades, were untried in battle. Also, the 2nd Parachute Brigade was the only full strength unit, as the 4th Parachute Brigade had only two battalions, with its third battalion still forming in Palestine.

There was only sufficient troop transport aircraft to support one division-sized operation, and that was allocated to the U.S. 82nd Airborne Division, under Major General Matthew Ridgway, as part of the Salerno landings. As a result, the 1st Airborne Division had to be carried to Italy by sea. With no landing craft available on such short notice, the division was carried across the Mediterranean by four cruisers, HMS Aurora, HMS Penelope, HMS Dido and HMS Sirius of the Royal Navy's 12th Cruiser Squadron, accompanied by the minelayer HMS Abdiel and the American cruiser USS Boise, all commanded by Commodore W.G. Agnew. If the landing was successful, the British 78th Infantry Division in Sicily and the 8th Indian Infantry Division in the Middle East, would be sent to reinforce the airborne division, under the command of V Corps.

== Landing ==
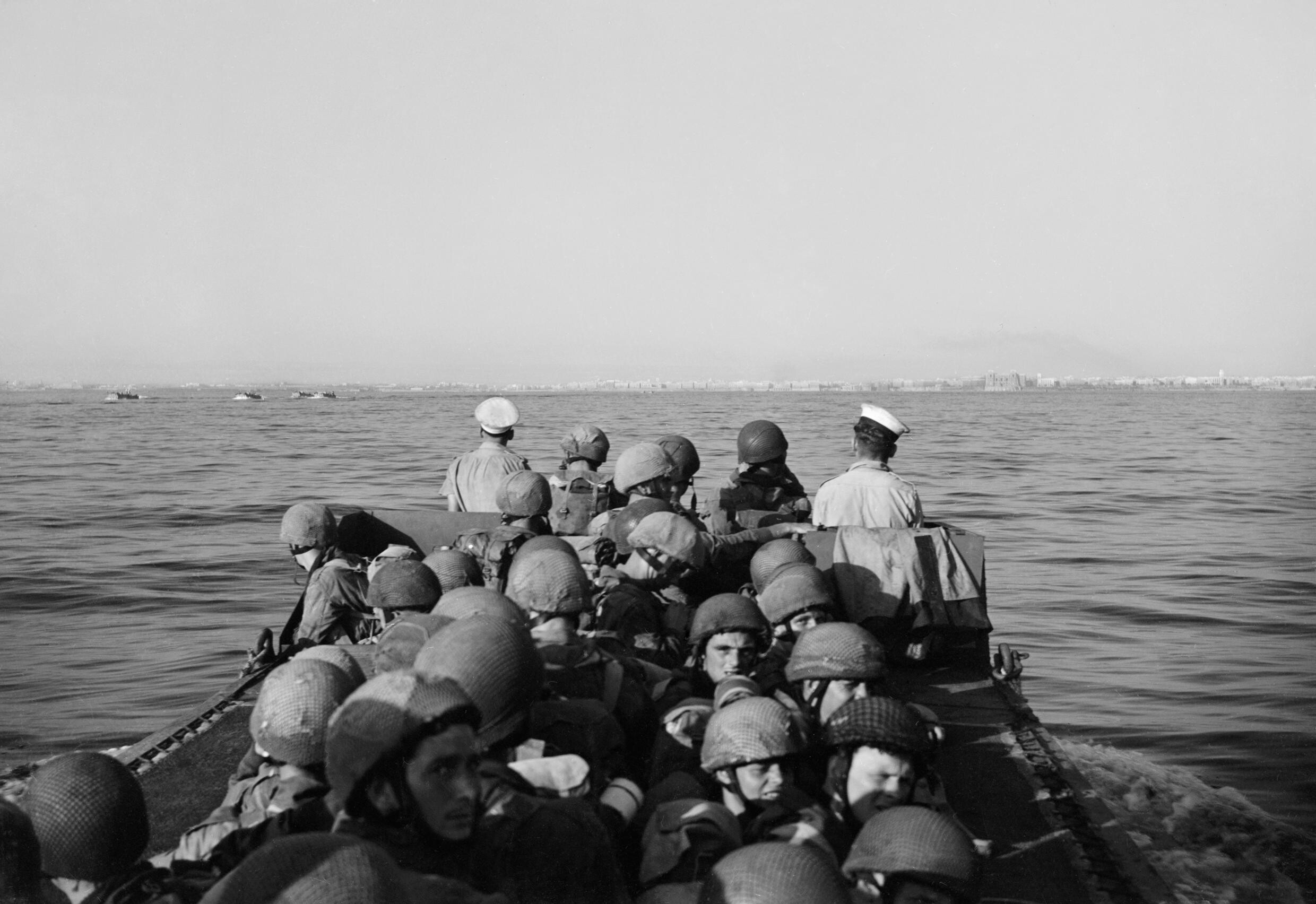
British airborne troops approaching Taranto in a landing craft, during the invasion of Italy, 14 September 1943.

Before leaving Tunisia, the 1st Airborne Division was divided into two-halves. The first half, consisting of the divisional headquarters, the 1st and 4th Parachute Brigade groups and the 9th Field Company, Royal Engineers, boarded the Royal Navy ships at Bizerta. The ships departed at 17:00 on 8 September, their decks loaded with the division's vehicles and stores. Admiral of the Fleet Sir Andrew Cunningham was concerned that the Italian battle fleet based at Taranto might sortie and attack the cruisers which would be unable to defend themselves adequately, overloaded as they were with troops and equipment. He therefore ordered the battleships HMS Howe and HMS King George V and their six escorting destroyers, commanded by Vice Admiral Arthur Power, to leave their base in Malta and join the flotilla. At 18:30 8 September, while the convoy was at sea, General Dwight D. Eisenhower broadcast the details of the Italian surrender.

To support the British landings early on 9 September, Scanzano was attacked by American B-26 Marauders from the 17th and 310th Bombardment Groups. Then, just as the Allied flotilla approached Taranto, the Italian battleships Andrea Doria and Duilio and three cruisers were observed leaving the harbour. The flotilla went to action stations, but the Italian ships just sailed past them en route to Malta to surrender in accordance with the agreement between the Allies and the Italian government. At 15:00, the flotilla reached the minefield guarding the entrance to Taranto. The destroyer HMS Javelin negotiated the minefield and entered the harbour. Two hours later, Javelin returned with an Italian harbour pilot on board. HMS Penelope and USS Boise were guided safely into the harbour and alongside the jetty, where they disembarked the troops they were carrying, while the other ships in the flotilla remained outside the port and used small ship's boats to take their soldiers ashore. The port's facilities were all in working order and were soon unloading the ships.

The first units ashore were the headquarters of the 4th Parachute Brigade and the 10th Parachute Battalion, which were directed to move inland to guard against a German attack. When the airborne division troops entered the city, they were welcomed by the Italian garrison and informed that the German forces had already departed. When the two brigades were offloaded, they passed through the city and set up defensive positions to the north. At the same time, Major-General George F. Hopkinson established his divisional headquarters in the Albergo Europa Hotel and accepted the Italian surrender from the military governor.

After safely landing the first half of the division, the 12th Cruiser Squadron returned to Bizerta to collect the remaining troops, consisting of the 2nd Parachute Brigade, the 1st Airlanding Brigade and the Glider Pilot Regiment. The only casualties in the landing occurred on 10 September when HMS Abdiel, while manoeuvring alongside the dock, struck a mine and sank. Casualties totaled 58 killed and 154 wounded from the 6th (Royal Welch) Parachute Battalion, and 48 dead among Abdiel's crew. Abdiel was also carrying twelve 6 pounder anti-tank guns of the 2nd Anti-tank Battery, and the division's reserve ammunition supply.

Overnight, the 4th Parachute Brigade led the advance inland. By daybreak on 10 September, they had reached Massafra, where they were welcomed by the population. The next town they reached was Mottola, which was still occupied by the Germans. The Germans put up some resistance to the 156th Parachute Battalion's assault, but withdrew soon after. The division's first combat casualties resulted from this action. The wounded were evacuated to Taranto, where the 133rd (Parachute) Field Ambulance had established an 80-bed main dressing station at the Rendinella hospital.

The German paratroop rearguard tried to delay the British advance with several ambushes and roadblocks. At a roadblock beside the town of Castellaneta, Major-General Hopkinson, the 1st Airborne Division's GOC, was hit by a burst of German machine gun fire while observing the 10th Parachute Battalion's attack. He died of his wounds the following day. Hopkinson was replaced as the divisional commander by Brigadier Ernest Down, previously the commander of the 2nd Parachute Brigade.

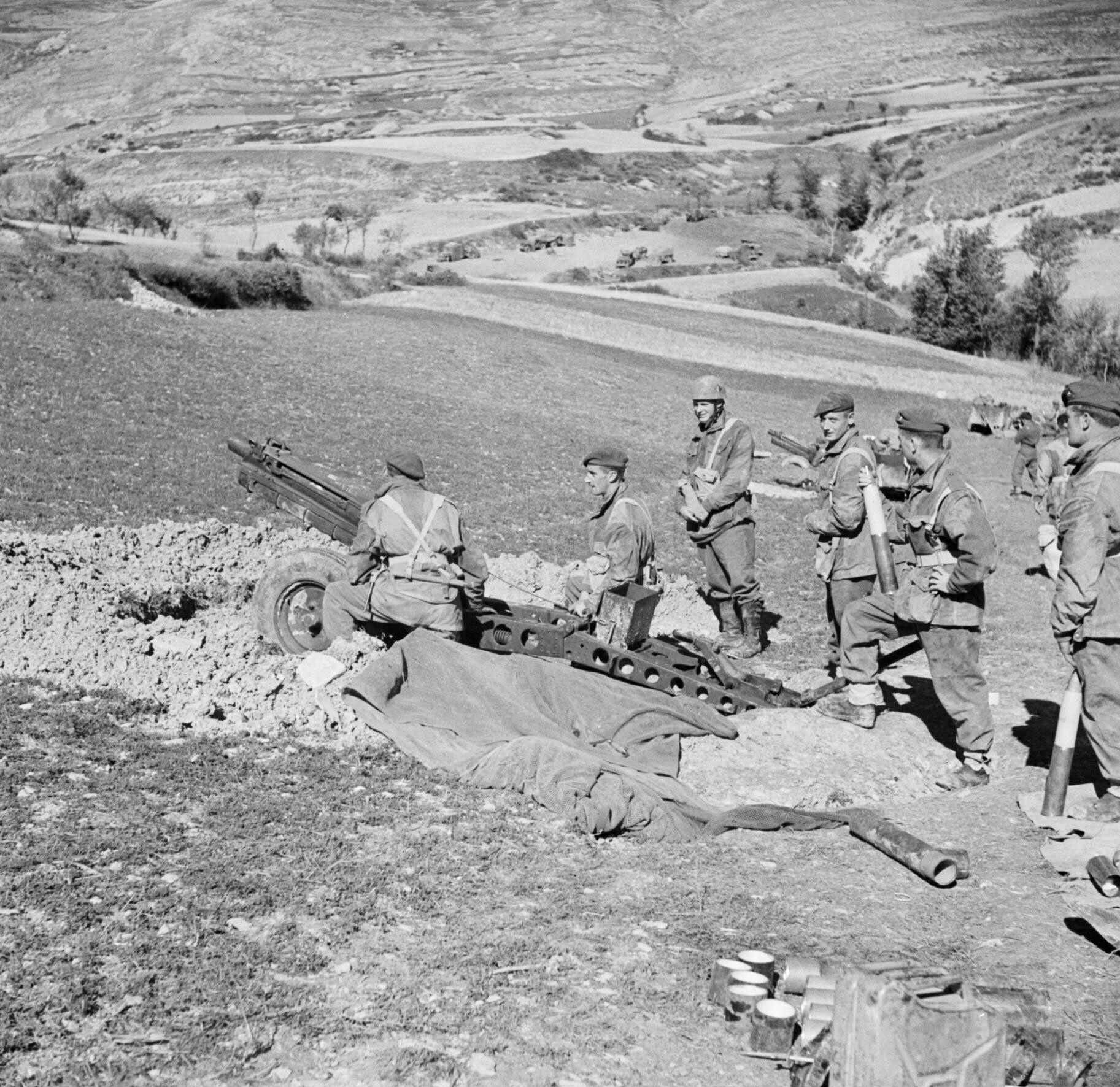
75 mm howitzer of the 1st Airlanding Light Regiment, Royal Artillery in action in Italy.

Within 48 hours of landing at Taranto, the airborne division reached and occupied the port of Brindisi and Bari on the Adriatic coast without opposition since both cities were still under control of the Italian royal army. On 11 September on the division's left, contact was made with the 1st Canadian Infantry Division, the leading unit of the British Eighth Army which had arrived in the area from Calabria. By the evening of 12 September, the 1st Airborne Division had advanced 20 miles (32 km) inland on foot.

The airborne division's next objective was now the airfield at Gioia del Colle. The Royal Air Force needed the airfield to bring in fighter aircraft from Sicily and support the landings at Salerno, which had not gone as expected. The Germans continued their withdrawal, and Gioia was reached over the night of the 16/17 September, by the 10th and 156th Parachute battalions. The Royal Air Force took over the airfield and 48 hours later, six squadrons were flying from the base in support of Allied operations. Between 20 and 24 September, the 1st Airborne Division was ordered to halt and construct defences on the approaches to Taranto, due to concerns that the Germans might launch a counterattack against the overextended unit.

The V Corps headquarters landed at Taranto on 18 September and prepared for the arrival of its two divisions. The first was the British 78th Infantry Division, which started arriving at Bari on 22 September, followed by the 8th Indian Infantry Division at Taranto the next day. On 24 September, the 1st Parachute and 1st Airlanding brigades took over the advance for the airborne division. By 27 September, they and the 78th Division reached Foggia, 125 miles (201 km) from Taranto. From there, the airborne division was withdrawn to Taranto. By November, most of the 1st Airborne Division had left for England.

== Aftermath ==
Operation Slapstick did not provide the diversion General Eisenhower had hoped for. The decision by Heidrich not to oppose the landings was made without reference to Kesselring's headquarters. Heidrich had expected to be confronted by an overwhelming Allied force and had withdrawn his units north, although he endeavoured to delay the Allied advance where possible by ambushes and roadblocks. The German division went on to frustrate the Allied attempt to advance on Rome during the Battle of Monte Cassino in 1944.

== Notes ==
Footnotes

Citations
