= Ernest Down =

British Army general (1902–1980)

Lieutenant-General Sir Ernest Down KBE CB
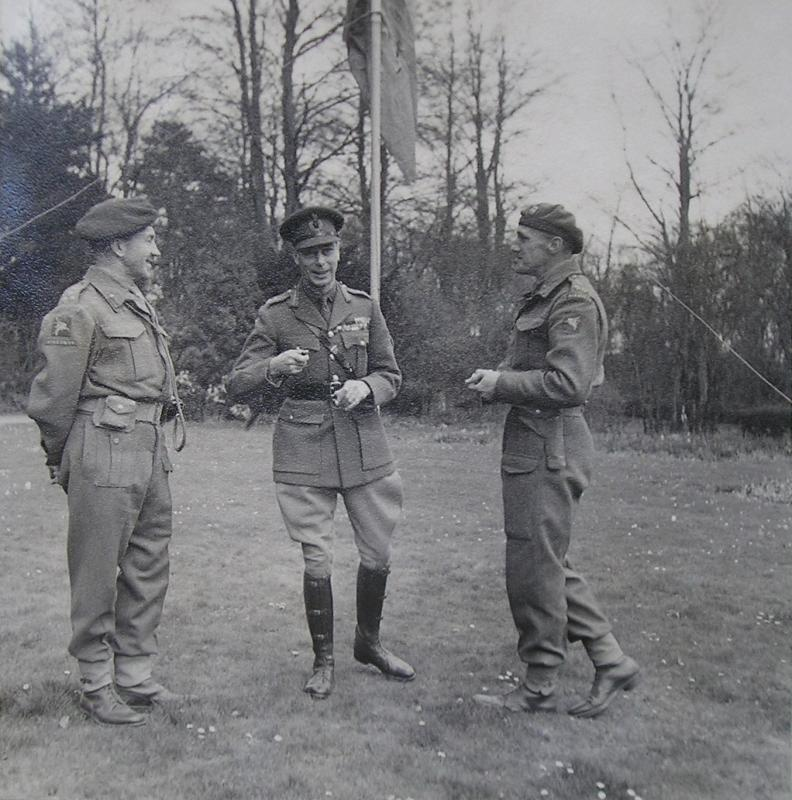
- King George VI (centre) with Major-General George Hopkinson (left) and Brigadier Ernest Down during a visit to Bulford, Wiltshire, April 1943.
- Born: 10 February 1902; Cornwall, England
- Died: 15 February 1980 (aged 78)
- Military career
- Allegiance: United Kingdom
- Branch: British Army
- Service years: 1923–1955
- Rank: Lieutenant-General
- Service number: 23809
- Unit: Dorset Regiment
- Commands: Southern Command (1952–1955); 53rd (Welsh) Infantry Division (1950–1952); British Troops in Greece (1947–1948); 4th Infantry Division (1946); 2nd Indian Airborne Division (1945–1946); 44th Indian Airborne Division (1944–1945); 9th Indian Airborne Division (1943–1944); 1st Airborne Division (1943); 2nd Parachute Brigade (1942–1943); 1st Battalion, Parachute Regiment (1941–1942); No. 11 Special Air Service Battalion (1941)
- Conflicts: Second World War
- Awards: Knight Commander of the Order of the British Empire; Companion of the Order of the Bath

Lieutenant-General Sir Ernest Edward Down, KBE, CB (10 February 1902 – 15 February 1980) was a senior officer of the British Army, who saw active service during the Second World War.

== Military career ==
Ernest Down was commissioned as a second lieutenant into the Dorset Regiment in February 1923.

Down served in the Second World War, attending a short course at the Staff College, Camberley in 1940, being appointed commander of the 2nd Parachute Brigade, then serving in North Africa in 1942. He went on to be General Officer Commanding (GOC) 1st Airborne Division, taking over from Major General George Hopkinson who had been killed in action in September 1943, in the early stages of the Allied invasion of Italy. He was then GOC of the 9th Indian Airborne Division, which itself became the 44th Indian Airborne Division in 1944 and GOC of 2nd Indian Airborne Division in 1945.

After the war, on 26 September 1946, Down was appointed GOC of the 4th Infantry Division in Greece. In 1947, after the division had been disbanded, he became GOC of all British Troops in Greece. Then in 1948, he became head of the British Military Mission to Greece. Returning to the United Kingdom, he was appointed District Officer Commanding Mid-West District and GOC 53rd (Welsh) Infantry Division in 1950 and GOC-in Chief of Southern Command in 1952, a post from which he retired in 1955.

Down was also Colonel of the King's Shropshire Light Infantry from 1955 to 1957.

== Bibliography ==
- Dover, Major Victor (1981). The Sky Generals. Cassell. ISBN 0-304-30480-8.
- Smart, Nick (2005). Biographical Dictionary of British Generals of the Second World War. Barnesley: Pen & Sword. ISBN 1844150496.

Military offices
Preceded by George Hopkinson	GOC 1st Airborne Division; 1943–1944	Succeeded by Roy Urquhart
Preceded by Colin Callander	GOC 4th Infantry Division; 1946–1947	Post disbanded
Preceded by George Wood	GOC 53rd (Welsh) Infantry Division; 1950–1952	Succeeded by Edric Bastyan
Preceded by Sir Ouvry Roberts	GOC-in-C Southern Command; 1952–1955	Succeeded by Sir George Erskine
Honorary titles
Preceded by John Grover	Colonel of the King's Shropshire Light Infantry; 1955–1957	Succeeded by William Reginald Cox
