= George Hopkinson =

British general (1895–1943)

Major-General George Hopkinson OBE MC
- Born: 14 December 1895; Retford, Nottinghamshire, England
- Died: 9 September 1943 (aged 47); Castellaneta, Italy
- Military career
- Allegiance: United Kingdom
- Branch: British Army
- Service years: 1915–1919; 1923–1937; 1939–1943
- Rank: Major-General
- Nickname: "Hoppy"
- Service number: 19368
- Unit: North Staffordshire Regiment
- Commands: 1st Airborne Division (1943); 1st Airlanding Brigade (1941–1943); 31st Independent Infantry Brigade Group (1941)
- Conflicts: First World War; Second World War: Italian campaign; Allied invasion of Sicily; Allied invasion of Italy; Operation Slapstick †
- Awards: Officer of the Order of the British Empire; Military Cross

Major-General George Frederick Hopkinson, OBE, MC (14 December 1895 – 9 September 1943) was a senior British Army officer who commanded the 1st Airborne Division during the Second World War, where he was killed in action in Italy in September 1943. In addition to being one of the few British Army generals killed in action during the war, he was also the only British general of the airborne forces to be killed during the conflict.

== Early life and First World War ==
Prior to the start of the First World War, Hopkinson worked as an apprentice at an engineering works at Retford, Nottinghamshire, his birthplace. Too young to join up when the conflict began, he enlisted in the British Army in early 1915, joining the Officers Training Corps and then being commissioned as a second lieutenant into the 4th Battalion, North Staffordshire Regiment as a second lieutenant (on probation) on 27 March 1915. After a short period on Guernsey with them, Hopkinson was posted to France as a signal officer in the 72nd Brigade, 36th (Ulster) Division. On 16 September 1918 he was awarded the Military Cross for his actions during the retreat of the British Army in 1918; the citation read:

For conspicuous gallantry and devotion to duty. During a fortnight's operations of a most arduous description, his services in maintaining communication between brigade headquarters and the front line were most valuable, and his example of fine personal courage and coolness under heavy fire, worthy of the highest praise. On one occasion, having been unable to find the battalion to whom he was to convey orders for retirement, he returned a second time, but encountered an enemy patrol, who opened a heavy fire. Eluding the patrol, he came across one of our wounded, whom he helped to get on to his motor-cycle and managed to convey back to safety, though all the time being subjected to heavy fire.

The war came to an end soon after, due to the Armistice of 11 November 1918.

== Between the wars ==
Hopkinson left the army shortly after the end of the conflict, and in 1919 enrolled in Gonville and Caius College, Cambridge, where he studied for a civil engineering degree. When he had finished his studies, he spent some time travelling throughout Europe, visiting Poland, the Baltic States and Russia.

However, after this period of travelling, in 1923 he returned to the army as a lieutenant and the North Staffordshire Regiment, and by the following year had reached the rank of captain. While serving with the regiment's second battalion he was promoted to adjutant. He began studying for entry into the Staff College, Camberley, then considered as almost essential for future advancement in the army, and eventually attained a place in the institution in January 1930. When he passed out of the Staff College he was seconded from his regiment and appointed as a General Staff Officer Grade III (GSO III) to the War Office in London, and was promoted a short time later to GSO II at the School of Artillery at Larkhill; during the period, he also learnt to fly, gaining his pilot's license in 1933. He was promoted to brevet lieutenant colonel on 1 July 1933.

In 1936 he returned to his regiment and commanded a rifle company as a brevet major, but, possibly unhappy at the slow rate of promotion during times of peace, in February 1937 he once again retired from the army, taking a job in a civil engineering firm that had operations in Turkey.

== Second World War ==
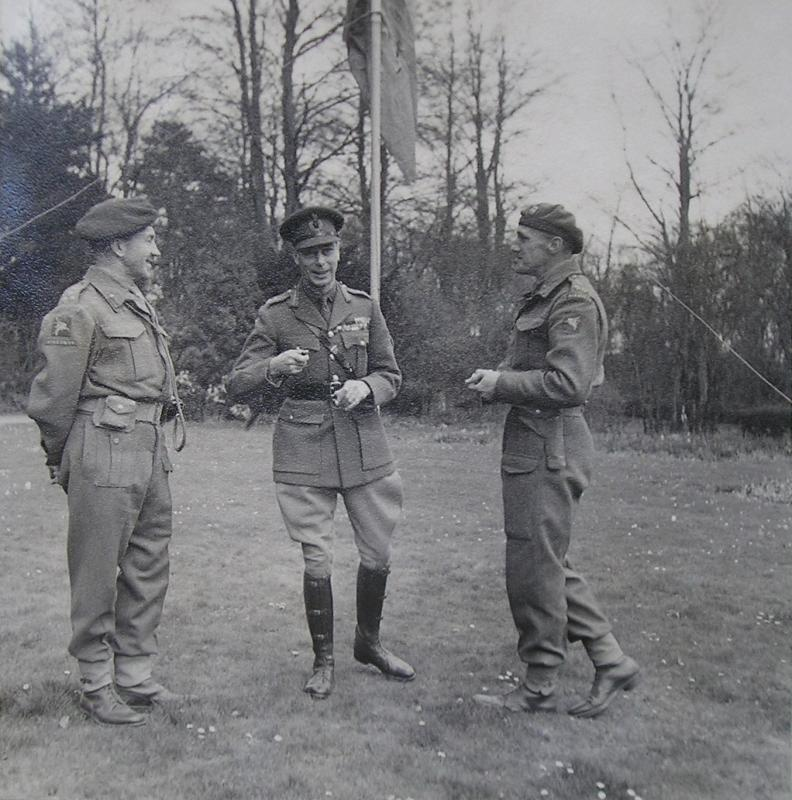
King George VI (centre) with Major General George Hopkinson (left) and Brigadier Ernest Down during a visit to Bulford, Wiltshire, April 1943.

When the Second World War began in September 1939, Hopkinson immediately rejoined the army and was posted to the staff of the military representative that served on the Supreme War Council.

In November he took command of a General Headquarters (GHQ) Reconnaissance Unit which served throughout the Battle of France; injured during a motorcycle accident, he recovered in time to evacuate himself and many of his unit's vehicles from Dunkirk. He was appointed Officer of the Order of the British Empire (OBE) on 20 August 1940 for his work during the Battle of France, in particular as liaison officer to Belgian forces.

He then qualified as a parachutist and was later assigned to the army's newly created airborne forces; as he trained he helped to pioneer a number of airborne tactics, including the delivery and casting off of gliders from the transport aircraft towing them.

In late October 1941 Hopkinson was promoted to acting brigadier and took command of the 31st Independent Infantry Brigade, which was soon converted into the 1st Airlanding Brigade, which soon became part of the newly established 1st Airborne Division, then commanded by Major General "Boy" Browning. Hopkinson's brigade, mainly composed of Regular Army units back from India, had originally been trained in mountain warfare but now had to be completely retrained for a very new and different form of warfare. As a result, most of the year of 1942 was devoted to training to land in battle by glider. This was much to Hopkinson's liking, who "lived and breathed gliderborne warfare".

On 6 April 1943 Hopkinson was promoted to the acting rank of major general, and succeeded Browning in command of the 1st Airborne Division, which began to depart for Algeria at around the same time. After being informed that Operation Husky, codename for the Allied invasion of Sicily, would take place in three months, Hopkinson was determined that the 1st Airborne would participate, and thus implemented a tough training regime to ensure that his division was sufficiently trained and prepared.

=== Sicily and Italy ===
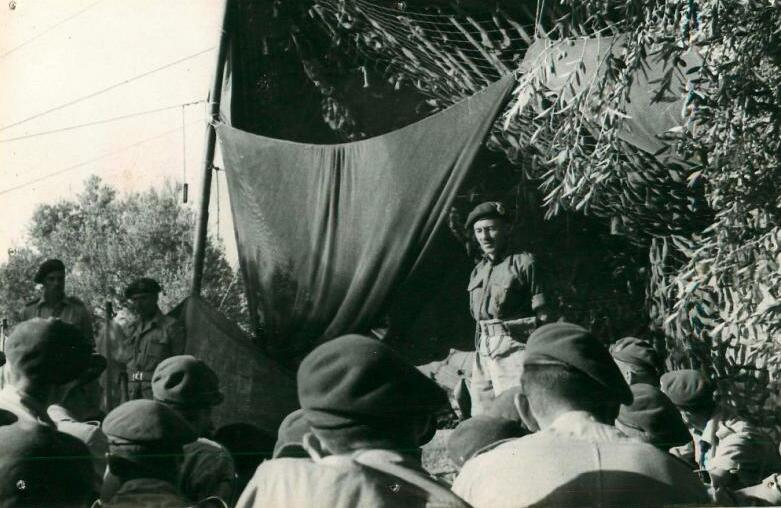
Major-General Hopkinson talking from a raised platform to men of the 21st Independent Parachute Company, North Africa, July 1943.

Operation Husky began on the night of 9 July with an airborne assault by Hopkinson's old 1st Airlanding Brigade (now commanded by Brigadier Pip Hicks, a First World War veteran, slightly older than "Hoppy") and the 1st Parachute Brigade of the 1st Airborne Division, and elements of the U.S. 82nd Airborne Division, with both divisions suffering heavy losses in men and equipment as they carried out their objectives. Due to a number of factors, including poor navigation and the inexperience of the pilots of the transport aircraft, many of the gliders transporting the 1st Airlanding Brigade failed to reach their assigned landing zones. One such glider carried Hopkinson and members of his staff; the tow-rope of the glider was detached prematurely and it was forced to ditch in the sea. Although uninjured, Hopkinson was forced to wait by the partially submerged glider until daylight, when he was picked up a Royal Navy destroyer. After both brigades had accomplished their missions, despite sustaining heavy casualties and landing miles from their objectives, they were withdrawn to North Africa to recover, and Allied ground forces began to fight through Sicily; fighting there ended on 17 August, and in early September the Allies launched their invasion of Italy itself.

On 8 September the 2nd and 4th Parachute Brigades landed in Italy, followed several days later by the remainder of the division landing at the port of Taranto. Hopkinson landed with the rest of the division and accepted the surrender of the Italian garrison there, then ordered the division to advance northwards. Fighting was fierce against Fallschirmjäger elements of the German 1st Parachute Division, which set up ambushes and roadblocks to deter the division; one such roadblock was set up near the town of Castellaneta. On 9 September, the 10th Parachute Battalion assaulted the roadblock, with Hopkinson in close attendance. During the fighting, Hopkinson was killed by machine gun fire. He was replaced by Brigadier Ernest Down, commander of the 2nd Parachute Brigade. George "Hoppy" Hopkinson was the only British airborne general to be killed during the Second World War, and is buried in Bari War Cemetery, Italy.

== Bibliography ==
- Dover, Major Victor (1981). The Sky Generals. Cassell. ISBN 0-304-30480-8.
- Harclerode, Peter (2005). Wings of War – Airborne Warfare 1918-1945. Weidenfeld & Nicolson. ISBN 0-304-36730-3.
- Mead, Richard (2007). Churchill's Lions: a biographical guide to the key British generals of World War II. Stroud (UK): Spellmount. ISBN 978-1-86227-431-0.
- Pirt, Asher C. J. (2011). GHQ Liaison Regiment (Phantom). Lulu.com. ISBN 978-1-4452-9099-7.
- Smart, Nick (2005). Biographical Dictionary of British Generals of the Second World War. Barnesley: Pen & Sword. ISBN 1844150496.
- Otway, Lieutenant-Colonel T.B.H. (1990). The Second World War 1939-1945 Army - Airborne Forces. London: Imperial War Museum. ISBN 0-901627-57-7.
- Whiting, Charles (1992). Slaughter over Sicily. Leo Cooper. ISBN 0-85052-307-9.

Military offices
Preceded by Frederick Browning	GOC 1st Airborne Division; April–September 1943	Succeeded by Ernest Down
