= Allied invasion of Italy =

1943 military campaign of World War II

Invasion of Italy
- Part of the Italian campaign of World War II
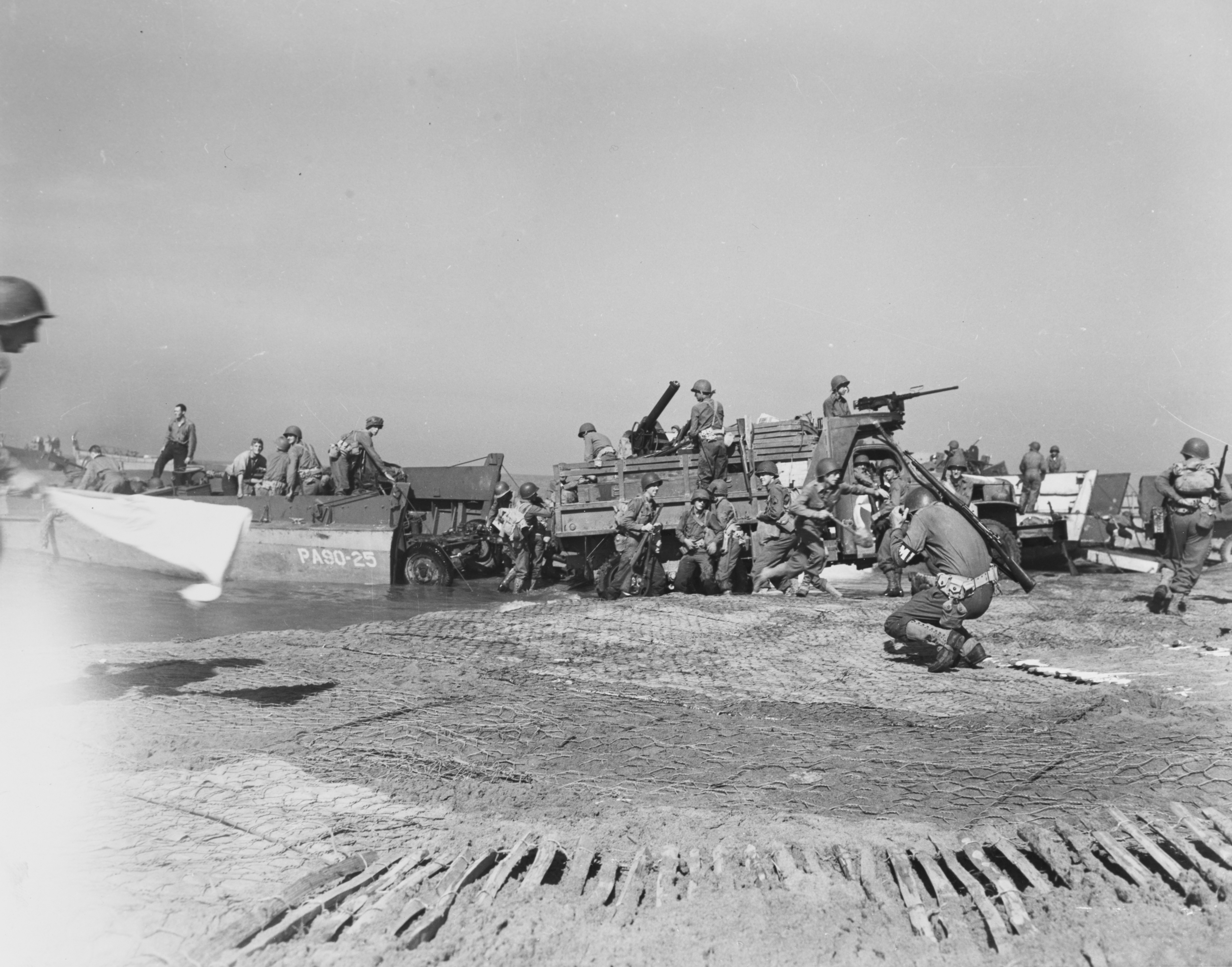
- Troops and vehicles being landed under shell fire during the invasion of mainland Italy at Salerno, September 1943.
Date	3–17 September 1943
Location	Salerno, Calabria and Taranto, Italy
Result	Allied victory

Belligerents
United Kingdom; United States; Canada	Germany; Italy (surrendered)

Commanders and leaders
(United States) Dwight D. Eisenhower; (United Kingdom) Harold Alexander; (United Kingdom) Bernard Montgomery; (United States) Mark W. Clark; (United Kingdom) Andrew Cunningham; (United Kingdom) Arthur Tedder	(Nazi Germany) Albert Kesselring; (Nazi Germany) Heinrich von Vietinghoff; (Kingdom of Italy) Mario Arisio (surrendered)

Strength
189,000 (by 16 September)	100,000

Casualties and losses
2,009 killed; 3,501 missing (presumed killed); 7,050 wounded	3,500 casualties (incl. 630 killed)

The Allied invasion of Italy was the Allied amphibious landing on mainland Italy that took place from 3 September 1943, during the Italian campaign of World War II. The operation was undertaken by General Sir Harold Alexander's 15th Army Group (comprising General Mark W. Clark's American Fifth Army and General Bernard Montgomery's British Eighth Army) and followed the successful Allied invasion of Sicily. A preliminary landing in Calabria (Operation Baytown) took place on 3 September, the main invasion force landed on the west coast of Italy at Salerno on 9 September as part of Operation Avalanche at the same time as a supporting operation at Taranto (Operation Slapstick).

== Background ==
=== Allied plan ===
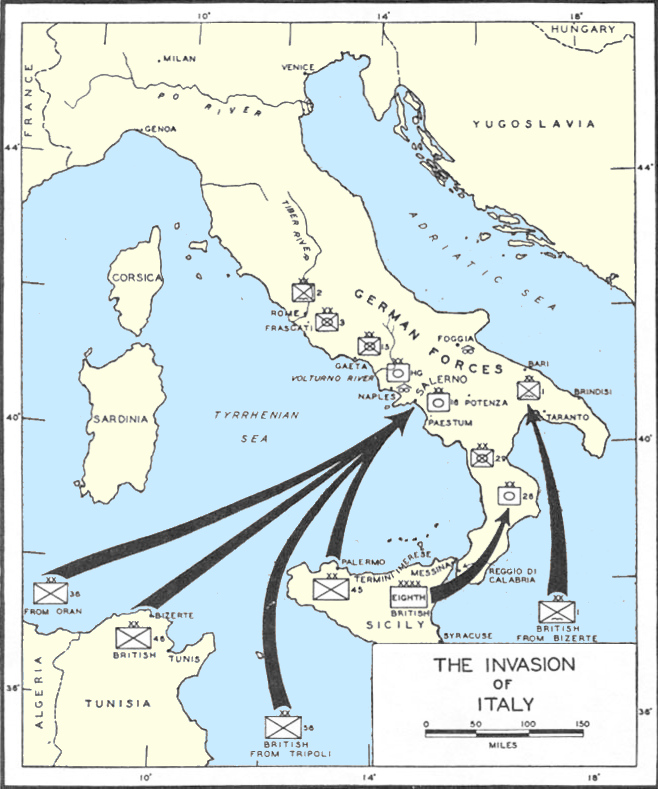
The invasion of Italy

Following the defeat of the Axis powers in North Africa in May 1943, there was disagreement between the Allies about the next step. British Prime Minister Winston Churchill wanted to invade Italy, which in November 1942 he had called "the soft underbelly of the axis" (American General Mark W. Clark would later call it "one tough gut"). Churchill noted that Italian popular support for the war was declining and an invasion would remove Italy from the Axis, thus weakening Axis influence in the Mediterranean Sea and opening it to Allied traffic. This would allow the reduction of shipping capacity needed to supply Allied forces in the Middle East and Far East theaters at a time when the disposal of Allied shipping capacity was in crisis, permitting an increase of British and American supplies to the Soviet Union. In addition, it would tie down German forces in Italy. Joseph Stalin, the Soviet leader, had been strongly pressuring Churchill and Roosevelt to open a "second front" in Europe, which would lessen the German Army's focus on the Eastern Front, where the bulk of its forces were fighting in the largest armed conflict in history against the Soviet Red Army.

However, U.S. Army Chief of Staff General George C. Marshall and much of the American staff wanted to avoid operations that might delay the main invasion of Europe, which had been planned as early as 1942, and which finally materialized as Operation Overlord in 1944. When it became clear that no cross-channel invasion of occupied France could be undertaken in 1943, both parties agreed to an invasion of Sicily, codenamed Operation Husky, with no commitment made to follow-up operations. After the highly successful outcome of the Sicilian campaign had become clear, both Churchill and Franklin D. Roosevelt, the U.S. President, accepted the necessity of continuing to engage the Axis before the start of the campaign in northwest Europe. Discussions had been ongoing since the Trident Conference held in Washington, D.C., in May, but it was not until late July, with the fall of Italian Fascist Prime Minister Benito Mussolini, that the Joint Chiefs of Staff (Note: Joint Allied Forces Headquarters (AFHQ) were operationally responsible for all Allied land forces in the Mediterranean Theater of Operations (MTO), and it was they who planned and commanded the invasion of Sicily and the Italian mainland.) instructed General Dwight D. Eisenhower, the Supreme Allied Commander in the Mediterranean theater, to go ahead.

Despite the overwhelming success of the Sicilian campaign, a significant number of Axis forces managed to avoid capture and escape to the mainland. Contemporary Axis propaganda portrayed this as a success. In late July, the fascist government fell and Mussolini was removed as head of the Italian government, envoys of which soon began approaching the Allies to make peace. It was believed a quick invasion of Italy might hasten Italian surrender and produce quick military victories over the German troops trapped fighting in a hostile country. However, Italian (and more so German) resistance proved relatively strong, and fighting in Italy continued even after the fall of Berlin in April 1945. In addition, the invasion left the Allies in a position of supplying food and supplies to conquered territory, a burden that would otherwise have fallen on Germany. As well, Italy occupied by a hostile German army would have created additional problems for the German commander-in-chief, Generalfeldmarschall Albert Kesselring.

The Allies had originally planned to cross from the island of Sicily into the "arch" area (Taranto) of the Italian mainland, envisioning a limited invasion of the Italian "boot", (Note: The shape of Italian peninsula is akin to a high-heeled boot, with the southwest tip of the peninsula being the toe and the eastern part the heel.) whence they would advance up the western coast, anticipating a strong defense by both German and Italian forces. The overthrow of Mussolini made a more ambitious plan feasible, and the Allies decided to make their invasion two-pronged by combining the crossing of the British Eighth Army under General Sir Bernard Montgomery into the mainland with the simultaneous seizure of the port of Naples further north. The range limits of Allied fighter aircraft based in Sicily reduced their choices to two landing areas: one at the Volturno River basin to the north of Naples and the other south of Naples at Salerno (though separated from Naples by the mountainous Sorrento peninsula). They chose Salerno because it was closer to their air bases. Operation Baytown was the preliminary step in the plan in which the British Eighth Army would depart from the port of Messina, Sicily, across the narrow Straits and land near the tip of Calabria (the "toe" of Italy), on 3 September 1943. The short distance meant landing craft could launch from there directly, rather than be carried by ship. The British 5th Infantry Division (Major-general Gerard Bucknall) of XIII Corps, under Lieutenant-General Miles Dempsey, would land on the north side of the "toe" while its 1st Canadian Infantry Division (Major-General Guy Simonds) would land at Cape Spartivento on the south side. Montgomery was strongly opposed to Operation Baytown. He predicted it would be a waste of effort since it assumed the Germans would give battle in Calabria; if they failed to do so, the diversion would not work, and the only effect of the operation would be to place the Eighth Army 480 km (300 mi) south of the main landing at Salerno. He was proved correct; after Operation Baytown, the British Eighth Army moved 480 km north to the Salerno area against no opposition other than engineering obstacles.

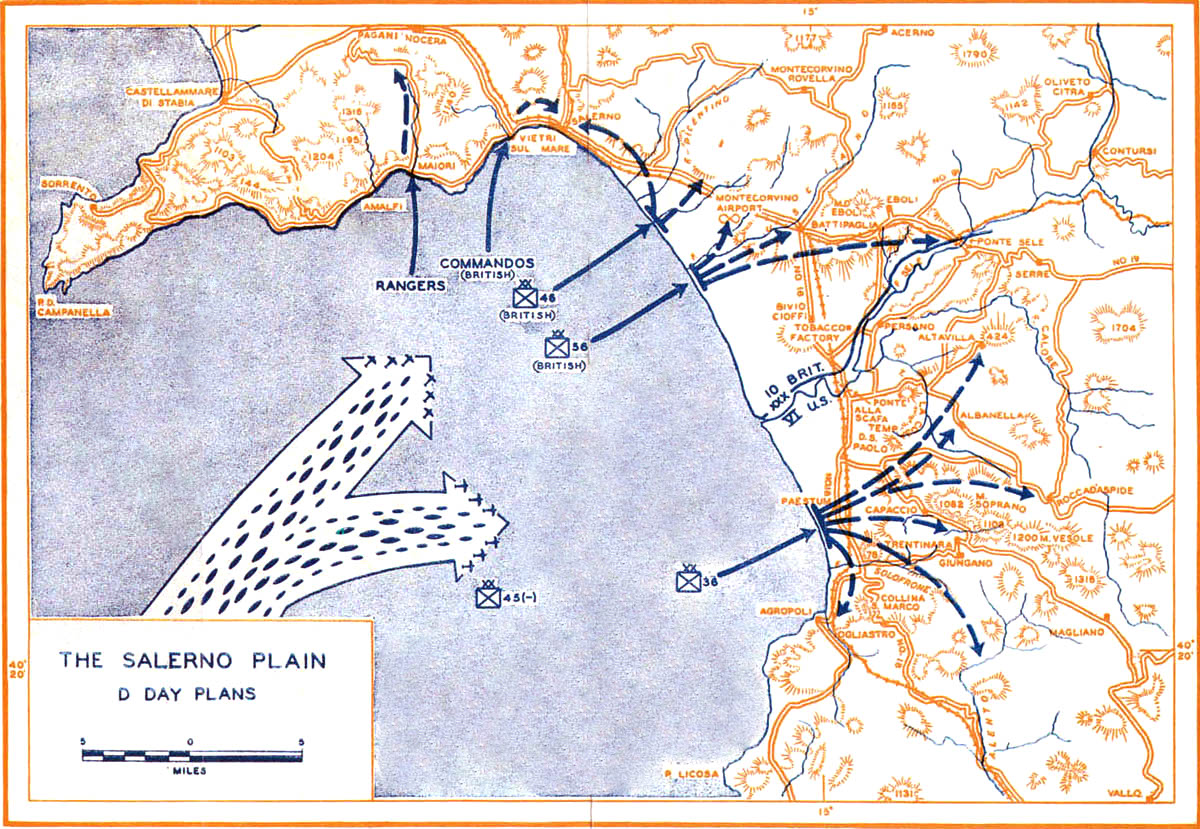
Salerno D-Day plan

Plans for the use of Allied airborne forces took several forms, all of which were cancelled. The initial plan to land glider-borne troops in the mountain passes of the Sorrento Peninsula above Salerno was abandoned on 12 August. Six days later it was replaced by Operation Giant, in which two regiments of the U.S. 82nd Airborne Division (Major General Matthew Ridgway) would seize and hold crossings over the Volturno River. This was at first expanded to include the entire division, including an amphibious landing by the 325th Glider Infantry Regiment, then deemed logistically unsupportable and reduced to a two-battalion drop at Capua to block the highway there. The Italian surrender on 3 September led to the cancellation of Operation Giant I and its replacement by Operation Giant II, a drop of the 504th Parachute Infantry Regiment on Stazione di Furbara and Cerveteri airfields, 40 kilometres (25 mi) northwest of Rome. This was intended to aid Italian forces in saving Rome, one of the most culturally significant cities in the western world, from German razing, a condition of the Italian armistice. (Note: According to the Pittsburgh Press, Major Paul Gardiner, a museum curator from Kansas City who acted as head of the Fine Arts and Education Department of the Allied military government in Italy, had been told by museum curators in Naples that the Germans had blown up the Pantheon and mined the Colosseum with the intent that in the event of defeat, an order would be given from the high command to destroy the city. Gardiner said these reports were hearsay and in hindsight the former report was obviously false, since the Pantheon still exists today. Similar orders were given to German general Dietrich von Choltitz as Paris fell back into Allied hands, which he claims to have defied.,) Because the distance from the Allied beachheads precluded any substantial Allied support of the airborne troops, Brigadier General Maxwell D. Taylor, the acting assistant division commander (ADC) of the 82nd Airborne Division, was spirited into Rome to assess the willingness of Italian troops to cooperate with the Americans. Taylor's judgment was that the operation would be a trap and he advised cancellation, which occurred late on the afternoon of 8 September after pathfinders had already taken off aboard their troop carrier aircraft.

The main landings (Operation Avalanche) were scheduled to take place on 9 September, during which the main force would land around Salerno on the western coast. It would consist of the U.S. Fifth Army, under Lieutenant General Mark W. Clark, comprising the U.S. VI Corps under Major General Ernest J. Dawley, the British X Corps under Lieutenant-General Richard McCreery, with the 82nd Airborne Division in reserve, a total of eight divisions and two brigade-sized units. Its primary objectives were to seize the port of Naples to ensure resupply, and to cut across to the east coast, trapping Axis troops further south. The naval task force of warships, merchant ships and landing craft totaling 627 vessels came under the command of Vice Admiral Henry K. Hewitt. Following the disappointing air cover from land-based aircraft shown during the battle of Gela in the Sicily landings, Force V of HMS Unicorn and four escort carriers augmented the cruisers USS Philadelphia, Savannah, Boise, and fourteen destroyers of Hewitt's command. Cover for the task force was provided by Force H under the command of Vice Admiral Algernon Willis, a group of four British battleships and two fleet carriers with destroyers, which was directly subordinate to the C–in–C Mediterranean Admiral Sir Andrew Cunningham.

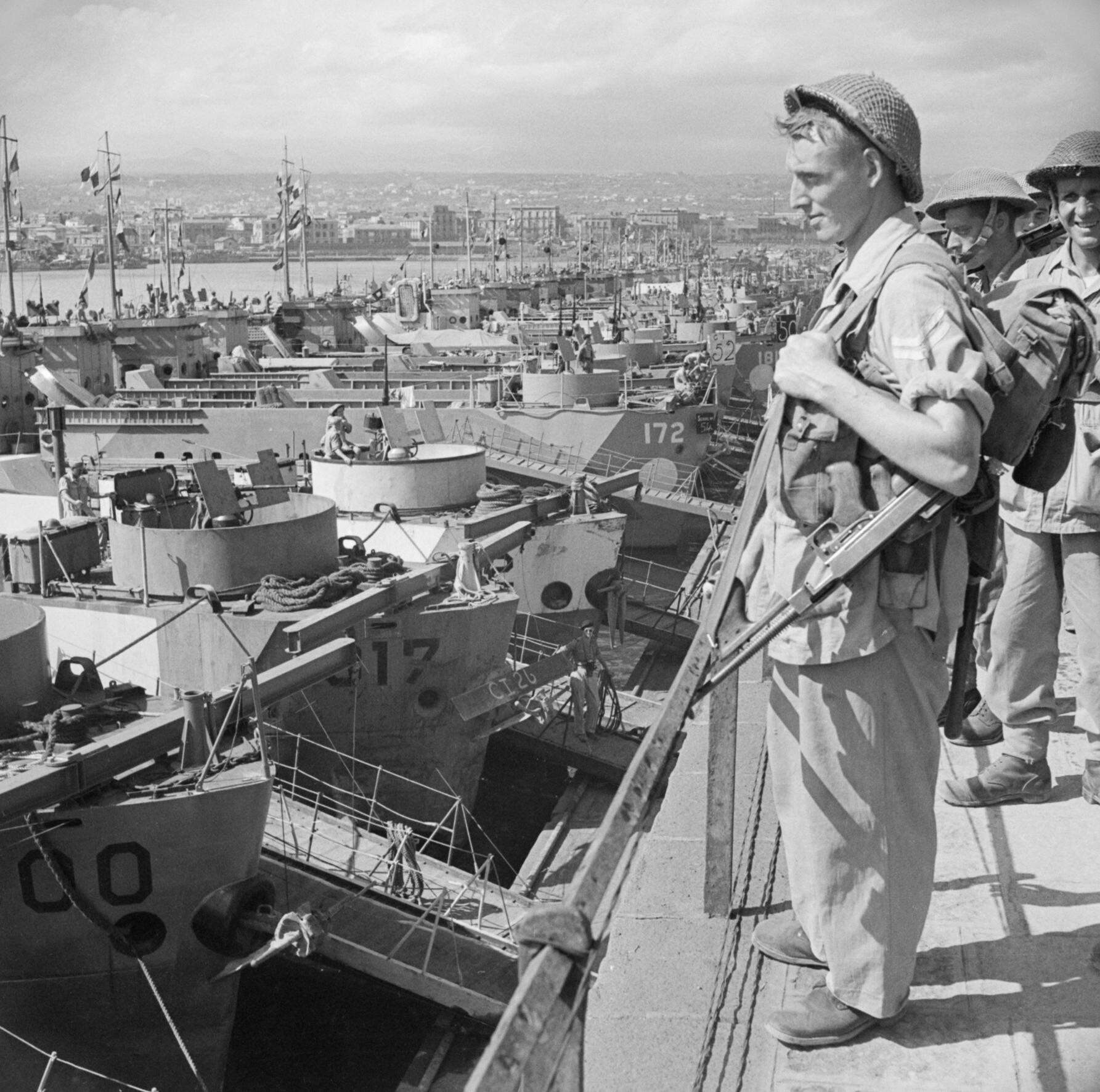
Men of the 2nd Battalion, Northamptonshire Regiment, part of 17th Brigade, wait to board landing craft at Catania for the invasion of Italy, 2 September 1943.

In the original planning, the great attraction of capturing the important port of Taranto in the "heel" of Italy had been evident and an assault had been considered but rejected because of the very strong defenses there. However, with the signing of the armistice with the Italians on 3 September, the picture changed. It was decided to carry the British 1st Airborne Division (Major-General George Hopkinson) to Taranto using British warships, seize the port and several nearby airfields and follow up by shipping in Lieutenant-General Charles Allfrey's British V Corps and a number of fighter squadrons. The airborne division, which was undergoing training exercises in two locations 640 kilometres (400 mi) apart, was ordered on 4 September to embark on 8 September. With such short notice to create plans, Operation Slapstick was soon nicknamed Operation Bedlam.

The Avalanche plan (using less than half the troops landed during Operation Husky) was daring, considering possible resistance by six German divisions. The Fifth Army would be landing on a very broad 56 km (35 mi) front, using only three assault divisions (one American, the 36th, under Major General Fred L. Walker, in VI Corps, and two British: the 46th, under Major-General John Hawkesworth, and 56th (London), under Major-General Douglas Graham, in X Corps), and the two corps were widely separated, both in distance (19 km (12 mi)) and by the Sele River. Clark initially provided no troops to cover the river, offering the Germans an easy route to attack, and only belatedly landed two battalions to protect it. Furthermore, the terrain was highly favorable to the defender. Planning for the Salerno phase was accomplished in only forty-five days, rather than the months that might be expected. A U.S. Army Ranger force, under the command of Lieutenant Colonel William O. Darby, consisting of three U.S. Ranger battalions (the 1st, 3rd and 4th), and two British Commando units, under Brigadier Robert Laycock (consisting of No. 2 (Army) Commando and No. 41 (Royal Marine) Commando), was tasked with holding the mountain passes leading to Naples, but no plan existed for linking the Ranger force up with X Corps' follow-up units. Finally, although tactical surprise was unlikely, Clark ordered no naval preparatory bombardment or naval gunfire support take place, despite experience in the Pacific Theater demonstrating it was necessary. (Major General Walker, commanding the U.S. 36th "Arrowhead" Division, believed the defenders, from Traugott Herr's LXXVI Panzer Corps, were too scattered for it to be effective.) The element of surprise was further limited by belated discovery of naval minefields off Salerno requiring landing craft to spend two hours traveling 19 km (12 mi) from the transports to the landing beaches.

On the German side, Kesselring lacked the strength to push the Salerno landing back, and was refused two panzer divisions from northern Italy to assist him.

Operation Avalanche was planned under the name Top Hat and supported by a deception plan, Operation Boardman, a false threat of an Allied invasion of the Balkans.

=== Axis defensive organization ===
In mid-August, the Germans had activated Army Group B under Erwin Rommel with responsibility for German troops in Italy as far south as Pisa. Army Command South under Albert Kesselring continued to be responsible for southern Italy and the German High Command formed a new army headquarters to be Army Command South's main field formation. The new German 10th Army headquarters, commanded by Heinrich von Vietinghoff, was activated on 22 August. The German 10th Army had two subordinate corps with a total of six divisions which were positioned to cover possible landing sites. Under Hermann Balck's XIV Panzer Corps was the Hermann Göring Airborne Panzer Division (under Wilhelm Schmalz), 15th Panzergrenadier Division (Eberhard Rodt) and 16th Panzer Division (Rudolf Sieckenius); and under Traugott Herr's LXXVI Panzer Corps was 26th Panzer Division (Heinrich Freiherr von Luttwitz), 29th Panzergrenadier Division (Walter Fries) and 1st Parachute Division (Fritz-Hubert Graser). Von Vietinghoff specifically positioned the 16th Panzer Division in the hills above the Salerno plain.

== Battle ==
=== Operations in mainland Italy ===
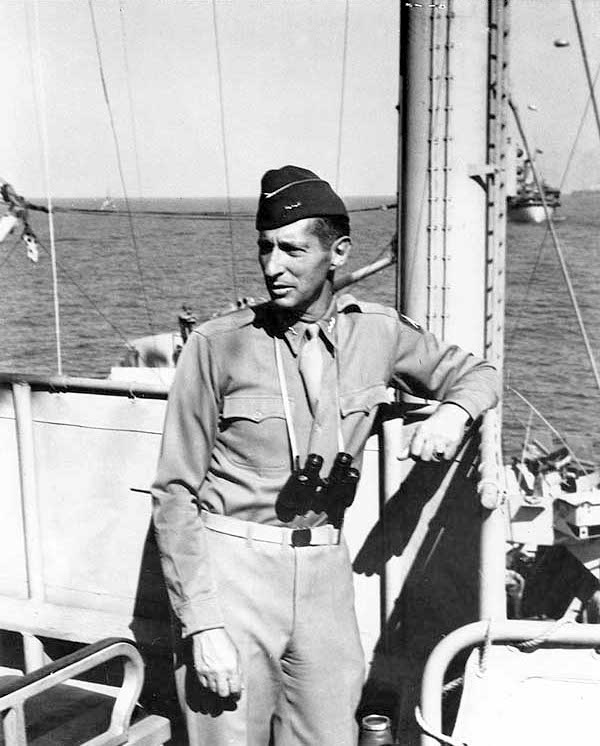
Lieutenant General Mark Clark on board USS Ancon during the landings at Salerno, Italy, 12 September 1943

On 3 September 1943, the British Eighth Army's XIII Corps, commanded by Lieutenant-General Miles Dempsey and composed of the 1st Canadian and British 5th Infantry Divisions, launched Operation Baytown under General Bernard Montgomery's direction. Opposition to the landings was light and the Italian coastal units surrendered almost immediately. Except to the Italian paratroopers of the 185th Infantry Regiment "Nembo" which was attached to the 211th Coastal Division had provided stiff resistance in the Aspromonte, but was able to overcome their resistance. Albert Kesselring and his staff did not believe the Calabria landings would be the main Allied point of attack, the Salerno region or possibly even north of Rome being more logical. He had already therefore ordered General Traugott Herr's LXXVI Panzer Corps to pull back from engagement with the Eighth Army, leaving only 29th Panzergrenadier Division's 15th Panzergrenadier Regiment in the 'toe' of Italy. By 3 September, most of this unit was in prepared positions at Bagnara Calabra, 40 km (25 mi) from the landings which it had orders to hold until 6 September. After this they were to withdraw to join the rest of the 29th Panzergrenadier Division which was concentrating at Castrovillari, 130 km (80 mi) to the rear. The Krüger Battle Group (two battalions of 71st Panzergrenadier Regiment, 129th Reconnaissance Battalion and detachments of artillery and engineers) under 26th Panzer Division, would then stand at Nicotera, roughly 24 km (15 mi) up the coast from Bagnara.

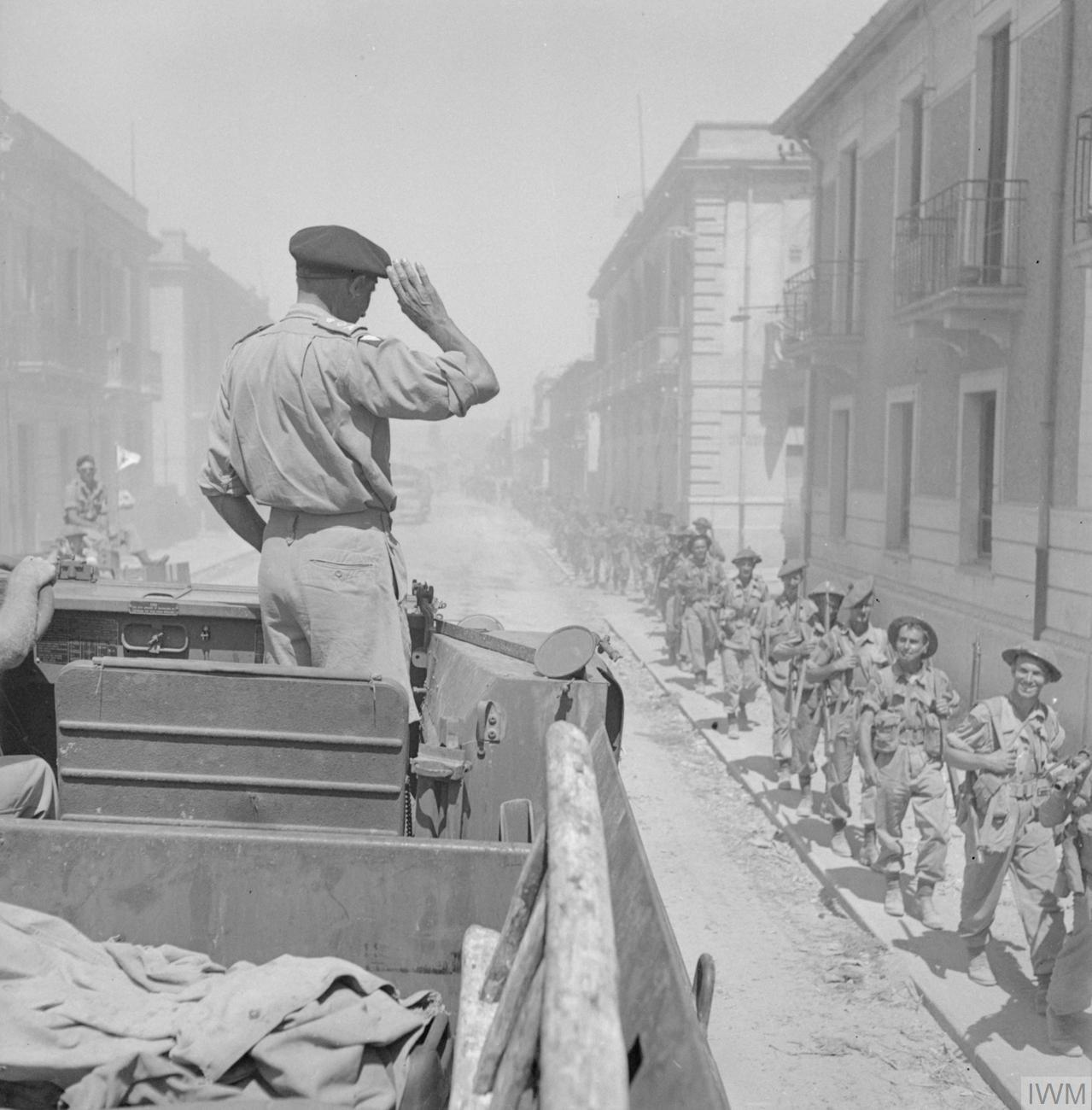
General Montgomery salutes his troops from a DUKW, Reggio, Italy, September 1943.

On 4 September, the British 5th Infantry Division reached Bagnara Calabra, linked up with 1st Special Reconnaissance Squadron (which arrived by sea) and drove the 3rd Battalion, 15th Panzergrenadier Regiment from its position. On 5 September the allies flew above Soveria Mannelli (central Calabria) and bombed all along the downstream area of the town, where Nazi bases and warehouses stood. Fortunately, the urban area was barely damaged. On 7 September, contact was made with the Krüger Battle Group. On 8 September, the 231st Independent Brigade Group, under Brigadier Robert "Roy" Urquhart, was landed by sea at Pizzo Calabro, 24 km (15 mi) behind the Nicotera defenses. They found themselves attacked from the north by a mobile force from 26th Panzer Division and from the south by the Krüger Battle Group which was withdrawing from the Nicotera position. After an initial attack that made no headway, the Krüger Battle Group veered away but the northern attack continued throughout the day before the whole German force withdrew at dusk.

Progress was slow as demolished bridges, roadblocks and mines delayed the Eighth Army. The nature of the countryside in the toe of Italy made it impossible to by-pass obstacles and so the Allies' speed of advance was entirely dependent on the rate at which their engineers could clear obstructions. Thus, Montgomery's objections to the operation were proved correct: the Eighth Army could not tie down German units that refused battle and the main obstacle to their advance was the terrain and German demolitions of roads and bridges.

By 8 September, Kesselring had concentrated Heinrich von Vietinghoff's 10th Army, ready to make a rapid response to any Allied landing. In Calabria, Herr's LXXVI Panzer Corps had two divisions concentrated in the Castrovillari area. Its third division, 1st Parachute Division (1. Fallschirmjäger-Division), was deployed toward Taranto. The rearguard in the toe was BattleGroup von Usedom, comprising a single battalion (1/67th Panzergrenadier Regiment) with detachments of artillery and engineers. Meanwhile, Balck's XIV Panzer Corps was positioned to face possible landings from the sea with 16th Panzer Division in the Gulf of Salerno, the Hermann Göring Division near Naples and the 15th Panzergrenadier Division to the north in the Gulf of Gaeta.

On 8 September (before the main invasion), the armistice of Italy to the Allies was announced, first by General Eisenhower, then in the Badoglio Proclamation by the Italian government. Italian units ceased combat and the Navy sailed to Allied ports to surrender. The German forces in Italy were prepared for this and implemented Operation Achse to disarm Italian units and occupy important defensive positions.

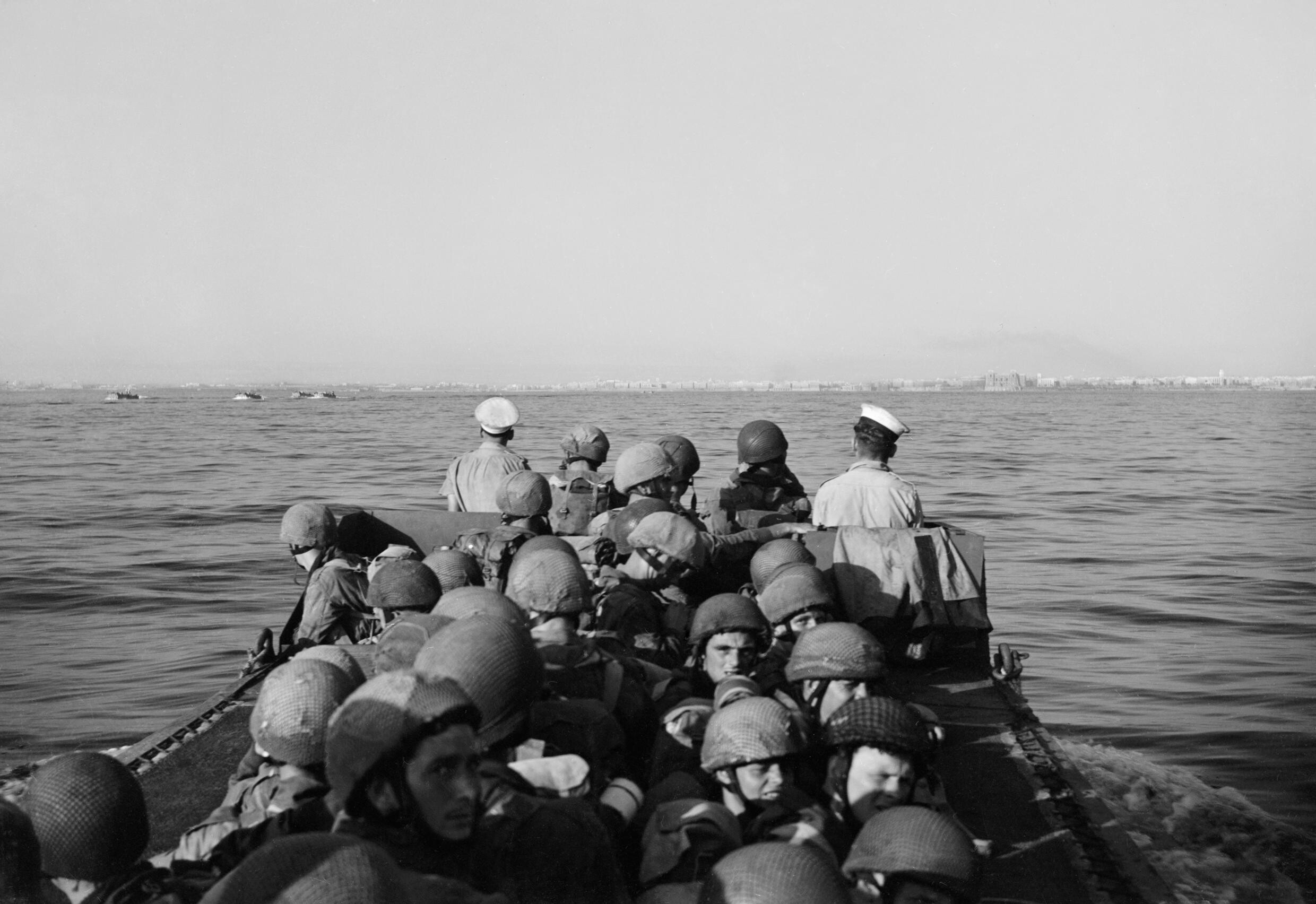
British airborne troops approaching Taranto in a landing craft, during the invasion of Italy, 14 September 1943

Operation Slapstick commenced on 9 September. The first echelon of the British 1st Airborne Division arrived on four British cruisers, a U.S. cruiser, and the British fast minelayer HMS Abdiel. The Italian battleships Andrea Doria and Duilio with two cruisers passed by, en route to surrender in Malta. There were no Germans in Taranto and so disembarkation was unopposed. The only casualties occurred when Abdiel, at anchor, struck a mine and sank in minutes, with 168 killed and 126 injured. On 11 September, as patrols were sent further afield, there were some sharp encounters with elements of the German 1st Parachute Division. But 1st Parachute could do little but skirmish and fall back because most of its strength was attached to the 26th Panzer and Hermann Göring Divisions at Salerno. Major-General George Frederick Hopkinson, General Officer Commanding (GOC) of the British 1st Airborne Division, was killed in one of these actions. By 11 September the ports of Bari and Brindisi, still under Italian control, were occupied.

=== Salerno landings ===
Operation Avalanche–the main invasion at Salerno by the American Fifth Army under Lieutenant General Mark Clark–began on 9 September 1943, and in order to secure surprise, it was decided to assault without preliminary naval or aerial bombardment. However, as Admiral Henry Hewitt, the amphibious force commander, had predicted, tactical surprise was not achieved. As the first wave of Major General Fred L. Walker's U.S. 36th Infantry Division approached the Paestum shore at 03:30 a loudspeaker from the landing area proclaimed in English: "Come on in and give up. We have you covered." The Allied troops attacked nonetheless.

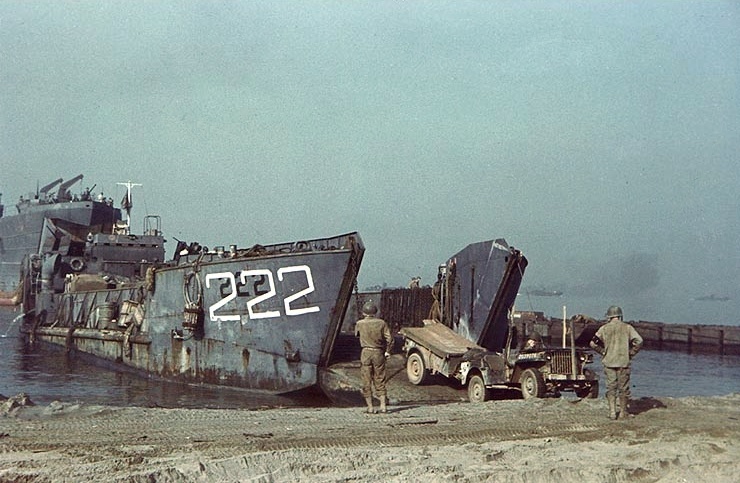
U.S. Navy tank landing craft offloads a U.S. Army jeep at Salerno.

Major General Rudolf Sieckenius, commander of the 16th Panzer Division had organised his forces into four mixed arms battle groups which he had placed roughly 10 km (6 mi) apart and between 5 and 10 km (3 and 6 mi) back from the beaches. The Dőrnemann group was just east of Salerno (and therefore were opposite Major General John Hawkesworth's British 46th Infantry Division when it landed), the Stempel battle group was between Pontecagnano and Battipaglia (and so faced Major General Douglas Graham's British 56th Infantry Division), the Holtey battle group was in a reserve role at Persano on the Sele river which formed the corps boundary between Lieutenant General Richard McCreery's British X Corps and Major General Ernest Dawley's U.S. VI Corps, while the von Doering battle group responsible for the Albanella to Rutino sector was 6 km (4 mi) south-east of Ogliastro, somewhat south of the U.S. 36th Division's beaches.

The British X Corps, composed of the British 46th and 56th Infantry Divisions and a light infantry force of U.S. Army Rangers and British Commandos of Brigadier Robert "Lucky" Laycock's 2nd Special Service Brigade, experienced mixed reactions to its landings. The U.S. Rangers met no opposition and with support from the guns of HMS Ledbury seized their mountain pass objectives while the Commandos, from No. 2 (Army) Commando and No. 41 (Royal Marine) Commando, were also unopposed and secured the high ground on each side of the road through Molina Pass on the main route from Salerno to Naples. At first light units of No. 2 Commando moved towards Salerno and pushed back a small force of tanks and armoured cars from the 16th Panzer Reconnaissance Battalion. The British Commandos captured the town of Salerno after some serious fighting that cost 40 (Royal Marine) Commando and 41 Commando nine killed and thirty-seven wounded.

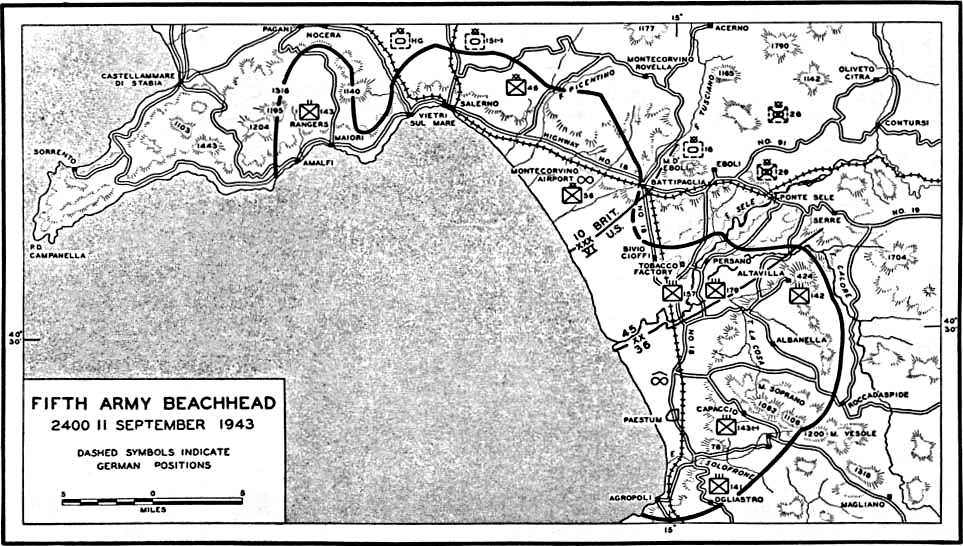
The Salerno beachhead at the end of 11 September 1943

The two British infantry divisions, however, met determined resistance and had to fight their way ashore with the help of naval bombardments. The depth and intensity of German resistance forced British commanders to concentrate their forces, rather than driving for a linkup with the Americans to the south.

At Paestum, the two lead battalions of the 36th (Texas) Division (from the 141st and 142nd Infantry Regiments) received stiff resistance from two companies of the von Doering group. German observers on Monte Soprano directed fire onto the landing craft. LST 336 took 18 hits, and some LCTs and DUKWs sheered away to avoid German shellfire. The division had not been in combat before and as a result of the Italian surrender, there was a general belief amongst the soldiers that the landings would be routine. The 141st Infantry lost cohesion and failed to gain any depth during the day which made the landing of supporting arms and stores impossible, leaving them without artillery and anti-tank guns. However, the 142nd Infantry fared better and with the support of the 143rd Infantry, the reserve formation which had landed by 08:00, were able to push forward. Minesweepers cleared an inshore channel shortly after 09:00; so by late morning destroyers could steam within 90 m (100 yd) of the shoreline to shell German positions on Monte Soprano. USS Philadelphia and Savannah focused their 15 cm (6 in) guns on concentrations of German tanks, beginning a barrage of naval shells which would total eleven-thousand tons before the Salerno beachhead was secured.

By the end of the first day the Fifth Army, although it had not gained all its objectives, had made a promising start: the British X Corps' two assault divisions had pushed between 8 and 11 km (5 and 7 mi) inland and the special forces had advanced north across the Sorrento Peninsula and were looking down on the Plain of Naples. To the south, the U.S. 36th Division had established itself in the plain to the right of the Sele river and the higher ground to a depth of 8 km (5 mi), although the 141st Infantry was still stuck near the beach. However, the XIV Panzer Corps commander, Hermann Balck, had seen the 16th Panzer Division's battle groups perform as intended and he had ordered both the Hermann Göring Division south to the battle and later in the day had been able to order 15th Panzergrenadier likewise. Meanwhile, to the south, the 29th Panzergrenadier Division from LXXVI Panzer Corps had also been directed to Salerno. Neither side had gained the initiative.

=== Luftwaffe response ===
Luftwaffe planes began strafing and bombing the invasion beaches shortly after 04:00 on the morning of 9 September before X Corps seized the Montecorvino airfield 5 km (3 mi) inland later that day, destroying three dozen German planes. However, failure to capture the high ground inland left the airfield within easy range of German artillery and therefore unusable by Allied aircraft. On 10 September, German bombers began targeting Admiral Hewitt's flagship USS Ancon while the ship was serving as General Clark's headquarters. The flagship called thirty "red alerts" over a period of 36 hours in response to 450 Luftwaffe flying sorties. Admiral Hewitt reported: "Air situation here critical." The Allied aircraft carriers had intended to withdraw on 10 September, but remained with the invasion so that their Supermarine Seafires could provide the air cover which invasion planners had expected to operate from Montecorvino.

Eighty-five Allied vessels were hit by German bombs off Salerno. Fritz X glide bombs dropped by Dornier Do 217s disabled USS Savannah and narrowly missed USS Philadelphia on the morning of 11 September. The following morning, Clark moved his headquarters ashore, and Hewitt transferred with his staff to the small amphibious force flagship USS Biscayne so the large Ancon could retire to North Africa.

=== Consolidation of the beachhead ===
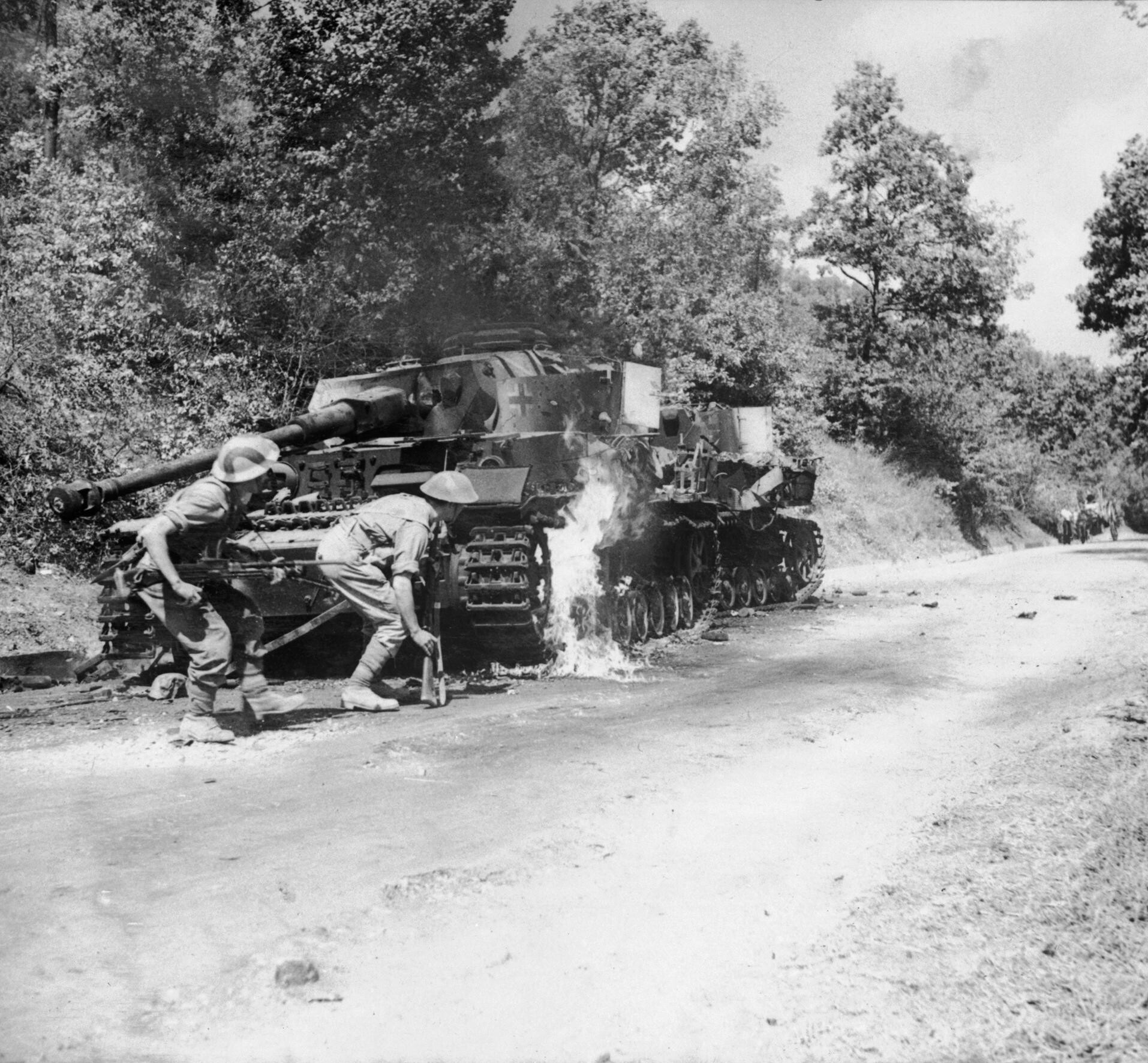
Men of the 2/6th Battalion, Queen's Royal Regiment (West Surrey) advance past a pair of burning German PzKpfw IV tanks in the Salerno area, 22 September 1943.

The Allies fought to expand their beachhead for three days while the Germans defended stubbornly to mask the build-up of their reinforcements for a counter-offensive. On 10 September, Clark visited the battlefield and judged that it was unlikely that X Corps would be able to push quickly east past Battipaglia to link with VI Corps. Since X Corps' main line of thrust was to be north towards Naples, he decided to move the VI Corps left hand boundary north of the Sele river and move the bulk of Major General Troy Middleton's U.S. 45th Division into the gap. In view of the enemy reinforcements approaching from the north he also ordered a battalion-sized mixed arms group to reinforce the Rangers the next day. Over the same period, German reinforcements filtered into the battlefield. Units, short of transport and subjected to other delays, arrived piecemeal and were formed into ad hoc battle groups for immediate action. By 13 September, all the immediately available reinforcements had arrived including additional elements from the 3rd Panzergrenadier Division which had been released by Generalfeldmarschall Kesselring from further north near Rome. By contrast, the Allied build-up was constrained by the limited transport available for the operation and the pre-determined schedule of the build-up based on how, during the planning phase, it had been anticipated the battle would develop. By 12 September, it had become clear that the Fifth Army had an acute shortage of infantry on the ground. That day, General Sir Harold Alexander, the 15th Army Group commander, reported to General Sir Alan Brooke, the Chief of the Imperial General Staff (CIGS), in London: "I am not satisfied with the situation at Avalanche. The build-up is slow and they are pinned down to a bridgehead that has not enough depth. Everything is being done to push follow-up units and material to them. I expect heavy German counter-attack to be imminent."

By 12 September, X Corps had taken a defensive posture because every battalion was committed and there were no reserves available to form an attack. In the south, the 36th Division made some progress but towards midday a counterattack by elements of the 29th Panzergrenadier Division overran the 1st Battalion, 142nd Infantry Regiment.

=== German counterattacks ===
On 13 September, the Germans launched their counteroffensive. While the Hermann Göring battle groups attacked the northern flank of the beachhead, the main attack was on the boundary between the two Allied Corps which ran roughly from Battipaglia to the Tyrrhenian sea, with the greatest weight due to fall on the VI Corps side On the morning of 13 September, elements of Major General Walker's 36th Division attacked and captured Altavilla from the high ground 14 km (9 mi) behind Paestum, but a counterattack forced them to withdraw as darkness fell. During the afternoon, two German battlegroups, the Kleine Limburg and the Krüger, had attacked Persano and overrun the 1st Battalion, 157th Infantry before crossing the Sele to engage the 2nd Battalion of the 143rd Infantry and virtually wipe it out.

The battle groups continued their strike south and south-west until reaching the confluence of the Sele and its large tributary the Calore, where it was stopped by artillery firing over open sights, naval gunfire and a makeshift infantry position manned by artillerymen, drivers, cooks and clerks and anyone else that Major General Walker could scrape together. Clark's staff formulated various evacuation plans: Operation Brass Rail envisioned Clark and his 5th Army headquarters staff leaving the beachhead to establish headquarters afloat aboard HMS Hilary. Operation Sealion envisioned shifting British X Corps to Paestum with VI Corps, while the alternative Operation Seatrain envisioned shifting VI Corps to the X Corps sector. The navy protested that reversing the landing process would be impossible since loading beached landing craft would make them heavier and unable to withdraw from the beach. Advice from superiors and subordinates convinced Clark to continue fighting, and he later denied seriously considering evacuation.

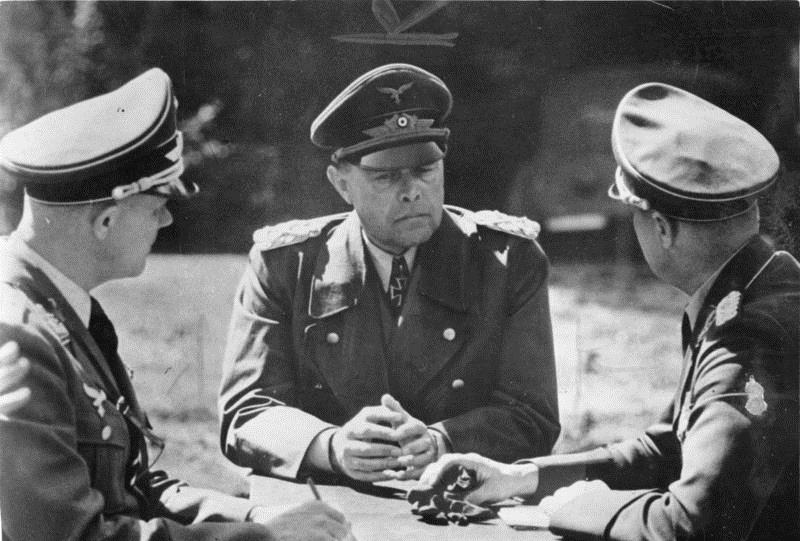
Generalfeldmarschall Albert Kesselring, Commander of the German forces in Italy

The U.S. VI Corps had by this time lost the best part of three battalions, and so the forward units of both its divisions were withdrawn to reduce the length of the defensive line. The 45th Division consolidated at the Sele - Calore position while the 36th Division was on the high ground on the seaward side of the La Caso stream (which flowed into the Calore). The new perimeter was held with the assistance of Major General Matthew Ridgway's 82nd Airborne Division. Two battalions (roughly 1,300 paratroopers) of Colonel Reuben Tucker's 504th Parachute Infantry Regiment (PIR), after the cancellation of Giant II, had been assigned to execute the final version of Operation Giant I at Capua on the evening of 13 September. Instead, they jumped inside the beachhead, guided by Rebecca/Eureka beacons and moved immediately into the line on the right of VI Corps. The next night, with the crisis past, 2,100 paratroops of Colonel James Gavin's 505th PIR also parachuted into the beachhead and reinforced the two battalions of the 504th. A clear sign of the crisis passing was when, on the afternoon of 14 September, the final unit of 45th Division, the 180th Infantry Regiment, landed, Clark was able to place it in reserve rather than in the line. The 325th Glider Infantry Regiment, reinforced by the 3rd Battalion, 504th PIR, landed by sea on 15 September. A night drop of 600 paratroops of the 509th Parachute Infantry Battalion to disrupt German movements behind the lines in the vicinity of Avellino was widely dispersed and failed, incurring significant casualties. In the X Corps sector the lead elements of Major General George Erskine's British 7th Armoured Division began to land, along with the 23rd Armoured Brigade.

With strong naval gunfire support from the Royal Navy and well-served by Fifth Army's artillery, the reinforced and reorganized infantry units defeated all German attempts on 14 September to find a weak spot in the lines. German losses, particularly in tanks, were severe. On 14 September and the following night, Tedder ordered every available aircraft to support the Fifth Army, including the strategic bomber force. Over 1,000 tons of bombs were dropped during the daylight hours.

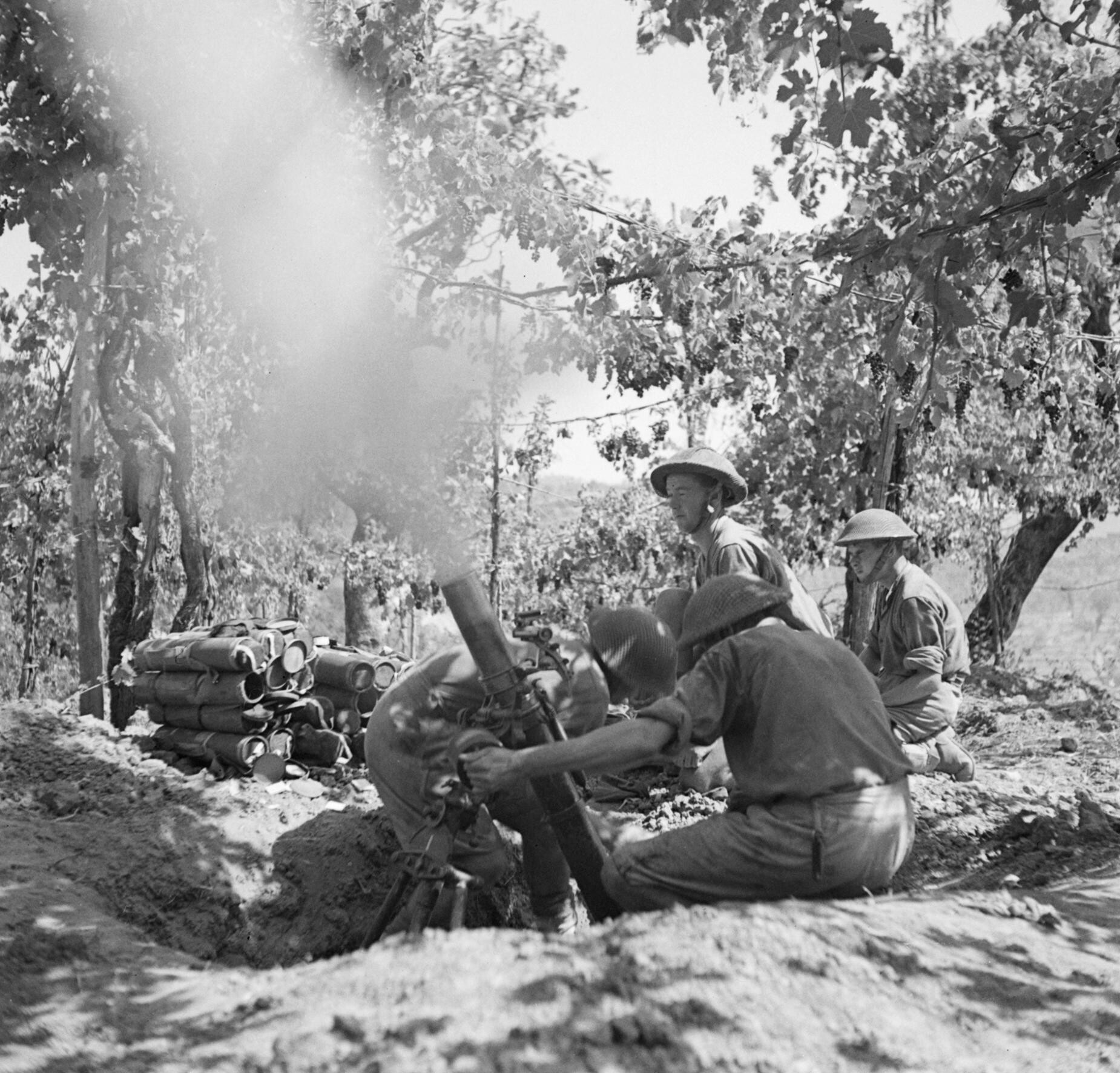
Men of the 5th Battalion, Hampshire Regiment manning a 3-inch mortar at Salerno, 15 September 1943

On 15 September both the 16th Panzer and 29th Panzergrenadier Divisions went on the defensive, marking the end to the thrust towards Paestum. Further north the Schmalz group of the Hermann Göering Division achieved surprise, attacking the 128th (Hampshire) Brigade (comprising three battalions, the 2nd, 1/4th and 5th, of the Hampshire Regiment), of the British 46th Division, on the high ground east of Salerno. The armoured column following up was intercepted and driven back, leaving the German infantry exposed.

The Allied bomber effort continued on 15 September, although slightly less intensively than the previous day, as did the naval bombardment. The arrival of the British battleships HMS Warspite and Valiant, with 381 mm (15 in) guns, off the beaches provided the Allied troops with a morale boost, although Valiant was not required to shoot and Warspite's 29 rounds were awe-inspiring but a minor contribution to the 2,592 naval rounds fired that day.

On 15 September, Kesselring reported to the Oberkommando der Wehrmacht that the Allied air and naval superiority had forced LXXVI Panzer Corps onto the defensive, and that a decisive success would depend on the attack by XIV Panzer Corps. If this failed, the 10th Army must break off the battle to avoid being 'mangled'.

On 16 September, the Schmalz group renewed its efforts on the X Corps front but with no more success, although No. 2 Commando suffered casualties, including 31-year-old Captain Henry Wellesley, the then-Duke of Wellington, who was killed. The Allied air forces and navies continued to batter enemy targets, although during an air attack by Dornier Do 217 K-2 bombers armed with Fritz X radio-controlled glide bombs, Warspite was hit and disabled, which required her to be towed to Malta for repair.

=== Eighth Army ordered to apply pressure ===
On 9 September, Montgomery's formations had been strung out along the coastal roads in the 'toe' of Italy. The build-up across the Straits of Messina had proved slow; he was therefore short of transport and decided to halt his formations to reorganize before pushing on. However, General Alexander issued orders on 10 September that "It is of the utmost importance that you maintain pressure upon the Germans so that they cannot remove forces from your front and concentrate them against Avalanche". This message was further reinforced on 12 September by a personal visit from Alexander's Chief of Staff, Brigadier A. A. Richardson. Montgomery had no choice- while reorganizing the main body of his troops, he sent light forces up the coast which reached Castrovillari and Belvedere on 12 September, still some 130 km (80 mi) from the Salerno battlefield. On 14 September, he was in a position to start a more general advance, and by 16 September the British 5th Infantry Division had reached Sapri, 40 km (25 mi) beyond Belvedere, where forward patrols made contact with patrols from VI Corps' 36th Division.

=== German withdrawal ===
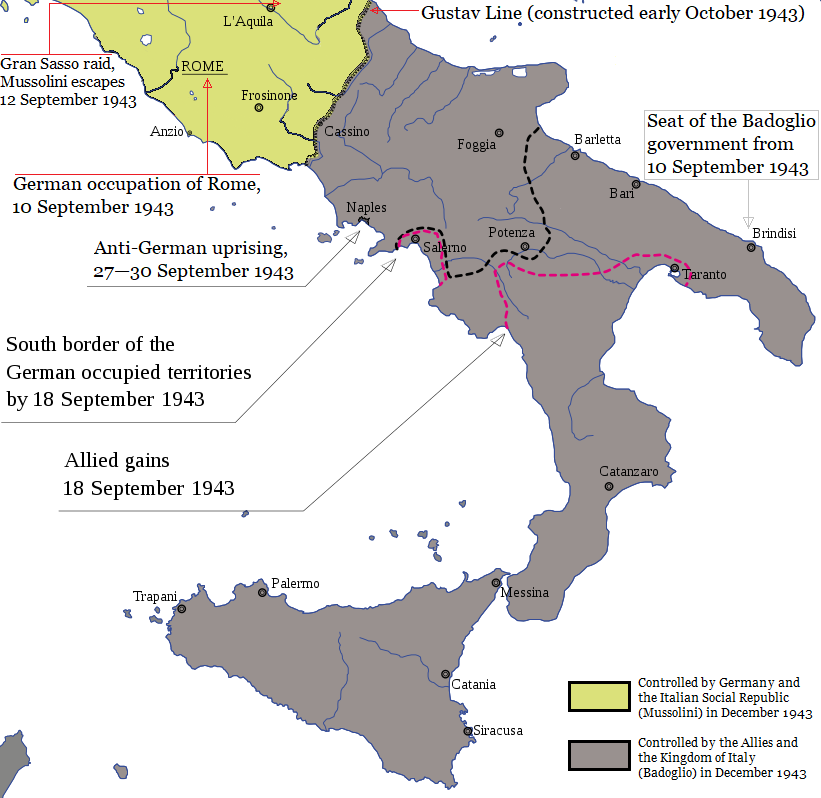
Italian military situation in September 1943

On 16 September, the overall commander of forces in the Salerno area, General von Vietinghoff, reported to Field Marshal Kesselring that the Allied air and naval superiority were decisive and that he didn't have the power to neutralize it. The 10th Army had succeeded in preventing troops from being cut off, and continuing the battle would invite heavy losses. The approach of the Eighth Army was also posing a threat. He recommended breaking off the battle, pivoting on Salerno to form a defensive line, preparatory to a withdrawal on 18/19 September. Kesselring's agreement reached von Vietinghoff early on 17 September.

General Hermann Balck, commanding XIV Panzer Corps - the principal armoured formation near Salerno - wrote that his tanks ‘suffered heavily under Allied naval gunfire, with which [they] had nothing to counter'. This triggered an Axis forces retreat from areas which were covered by Allied naval gunfire.

General von Vietinghoff then reported to his superior that his attacks ‘were unable to reach their objective owing to the fire from naval guns and low-flying aircraft'. Allied air and naval support lines, aided by the Italian partisan movement, proved far superior to the German support, and were able to aid the Allied advance to a substantial degree.

=== Salerno mutiny ===
The Salerno battle was also the site of the Salerno Mutiny instigated by about 500 men of the British X Corps, which had by this time suffered over 6,000 casualties, who, on 16 September, refused assignment to new units as battle casualty replacements. They had previously understood that they would be returning to their original units, from which they had been separated during the fighting in the North African campaign. Eventually, the corps commander, Lieutenant-General Richard McCreery, persuaded about half of the men to follow their orders. The remainder were court-martialled. Three NCOs who led the mutiny were sentenced to death but the sentence was not carried out and they were eventually allowed to rejoin units.

=== Further Allied advances ===
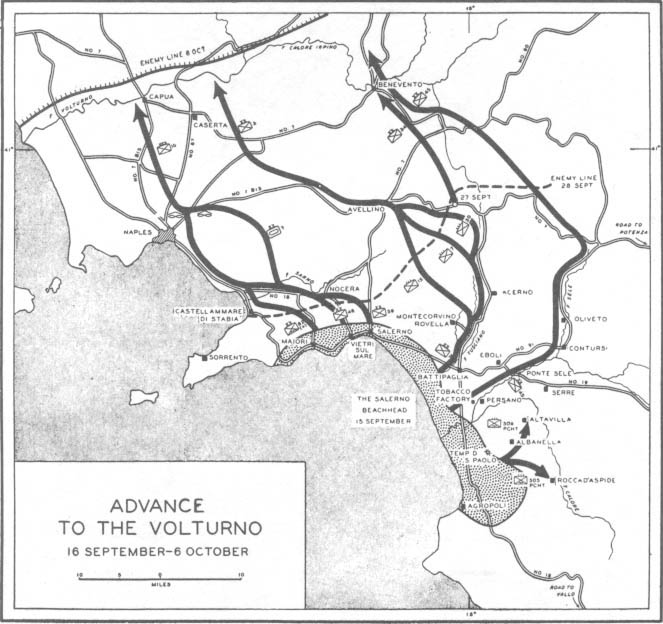
Allied advance to the Volturno river.

With the Salerno beachhead secure, the Fifth Army began its attack northwest towards Naples on 19 September. On 20 September, Major General Ernest J. Dawley, the U.S. VI Corps commander, was relieved of his command by Clark and replaced by Major General John P. Lucas. The U.S. 82nd Airborne Division, after suffering serious casualties near Altavilla, was merged with British X Corps, joining the U.S. Army Rangers and the British 23rd Armoured Brigade on the Sorrento Peninsula to flank the German defenses at Nocera Inferiore, Sant'Antonio Abate, and Angri, which the British 46th Infantry Division attacked. The British 7th Armoured Division, passing through the 46th Division, was assigned the task of taking Naples, while the newly landed U.S. 3rd Infantry Division took Acerno on 22 September and Avellino on 28 September.

The Eighth Army made good progress from the "toe" in spite of German demolitions and linked with the British 1st Airborne Division at Taranto. Its left linked up with the Fifth Army's right on 16 September. The Eighth Army now concentrated its forces east of the Apennine Mountains and pushed north along the Adriatic coast through Bari. On 27 September, the Eighth Army captured the large airfield complex near Foggia, a major Allied objective.

At the same time British X Corps made good progress; they pushed through the mountain passes of Monti Lattari and captured a vital bridge over the Sarno River at Scafati. They surrounded Mount Vesuvius and prepared to advance on Naples. The Fascist troops occupying the city provoked a rebellion by the population which started on 27 September. With the swift advance by British X Corps and Naples in rebellion, the Germans were forced to evacuate. On 1 October, "A" Squadron of the 1st King's Dragoon Guards entered Naples, the first Allied unit to do so. The entire Fifth Army, now consisting of five American and three British divisions, reached the line of the Volturno River on 6 October. This provided a natural defensive barrier, securing Naples, along with the Campanian plain and the vital airfields on it, from a German counterattack.

Meanwhile, on the Adriatic Coast, the Eighth Army advanced to a line from Campobasso to Larino and Termoli on the Biferno river.

== Aftermath ==
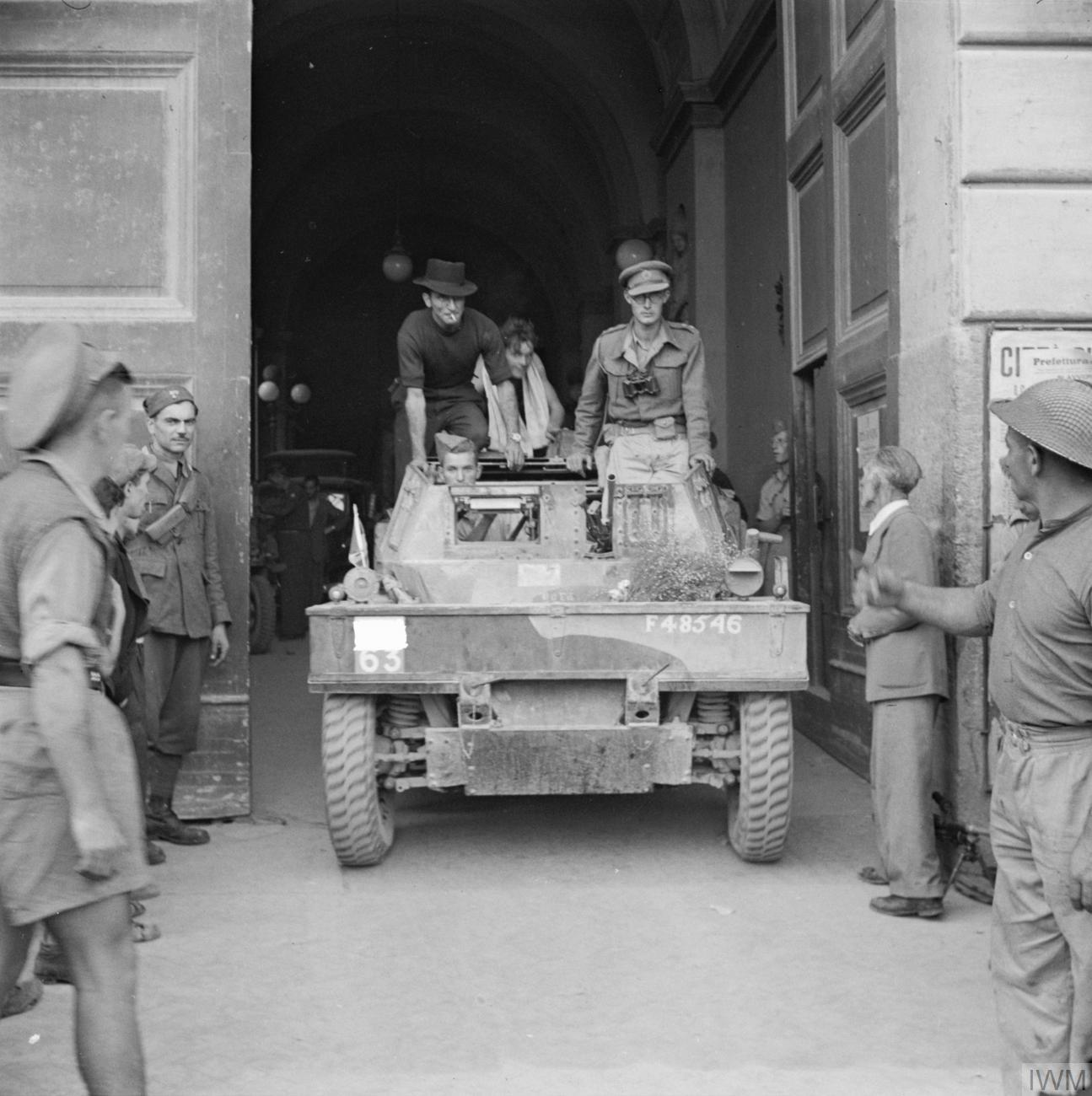
Daimler scout car of the 1st King's Dragoon Guards at the town hall in Naples, 1 October 1943.

The 10th Army had come close to defeating the Salerno beachhead. The stubborn initial resistance by 16th Panzer Division's battlegroups and the Germans' ability to move land reinforcements more quickly than the Allies could land follow-up forces by sea or air nearly tipped the battle. The Fifth Army planners had concentrated the main weight of its forces in X Corps on its left-wing, in line with its major objective of advancing on Naples. However, this had left its right-wing too thinly manned to defend X Corps' right flank and left a particular weakness at the corps boundary. The Germans, aware of the limited time available to deal with the Salerno landings because of the inevitable arrival of the Eighth Army, were obliged to make hurried and uncoordinated attempts to force a quick decision, having failed to break through Allied lines and exploit the gains in the face of Allied air and naval superiority. It was at this time Adolf Hitler sided with the view of his Army Group commander in Northern Italy, Erwin Rommel, and decided that defending Italy south of Rome was not feasible. As a result, Kesselring was forbidden to call upon reserves from the Northern Army Group.

Kesselring's strategic arguments persuaded Hitler that the Allies should be kept away from German borders and prevented from gaining the oil resources of the Balkans. On 6 November, Hitler ordered Rommel to withdraw to Northern France and gave Kesselring command of the whole of Italy, instructing him that he keep Rome in German hands for as long as possible.

By early October 1943, the whole of southern Italy was in Allied hands. The Allied armies stood facing the Volturno Line, the first of a series of prepared defensive lines running across Italy from which the Germans chose to fight delaying actions, giving ground slowly and buying time to complete their preparation of the Winter Line, their strongest defensive line south of Rome. The next stage of the Italian campaign became a grinding and attritional slog against well-prepared defenses in terrain and weather conditions which favored defense. Weather conditions hampered the Allied advantages in mechanized equipment and air superiority. It took until mid-January 1944 to fight through three auxiliary defensive lines to reach the Gustav Line, the backbone of the Winter Line defenses, setting the scene for the four battles of Monte Cassino which took place between January and May 1944.

=== Clark's award ===
Lieutenant General Mark W. Clark, the U.S. Fifth Army commander, was awarded the Distinguished Service Cross, the second-highest U.S. award for valor in combat, for his front-line leadership during this crisis. He was frequently seen in the most forward positions encouraging the troops.

== See also ==
- Allied invasion of Italy order of battle
- European theatre of World War II
- Military history of Italy during World War II
