= Ted Loden =

British Army officer (1940–2013)

- Born: 9 July 1940
- Died: 7 September 2013 (aged 73); Nairobi, Kenya (aged 73)
- Cause of death: Murder by gunshot
- Military career
- Allegiance: United Kingdom
- Branch: British Army
- Rank: Colonel
- Units: 1st Battalion, Parachute Regiment; 4th Battalion, Parachute Regiment
- Known for: Commanding soldiers who killed 13 unarmed civilians on Bloody Sunday
- Conflicts: Aden Emergency; The Troubles
- Awards: Military Cross

Colonel Edward Charles Loden MC (9 July 1940 – 7 September 2013) was a British Army officer.

He was commissioned as a Second Lieutenant in April 1960, and joined the Parachute Regiment in July 1961. He was awarded the Military Cross as a captain, serving as the Intelligence Ofiicer in 1 PARA, for his actions during the Aden Emergency in June 1967.

As a Major, while serving in Northern Ireland on Operation Banner, he was a commander during Bloody Sunday on 30 January 1972; he was later exonerated by the Bloody Sunday Inquiry. He went on to hold several other posts in the British Army, including Brigade Major to 44 Para Brigade, Commanding Officer of 4 Para, Defence Attaché in Tel Aviv, and Colonel of Depot Para in Aldershot. He retired from the Army on 30 September 1992.

Loden was shot dead on 7 September 2013 by armed robbers in Nairobi, Kenya, while he was visiting his son, who had also served with the Parachute Regiment.
