= Derek Wilford =

British Army officer (1933–2023)

Derek Wilford OBE
- Born: 16 February 1933; Leicestershire
- Died: 24 November 2023 (aged 90); Lens, Wallonia, Belgium
- Education: Eaton Hall, Cheshire
- Military career
- Allegiance: United Kingdom
- Branch: British Army
- Service years: 1952–1983
- Rank: Colonel
- Unit: Parachute Regiment
- Commands: 1st Battalion, The Parachute Regiment
- Known for: Commanding soldiers who killed 13 unarmed civilians on Bloody Sunday
- Conflicts: Operation Banner
- Awards: Officer of the Order of the British Empire

Colonel Derek Wilford (16 February 1933 – 24 November 2023) was a British Army officer who commanded the 1st Battalion, Parachute Regiment from 1971 to 1973 during The Troubles in Northern Ireland. His tenure as Commanding Officer of 1 Para was overshadowed by the Ballymurphy Massacre in Belfast and Bloody Sunday in Derry, making him one of the most controversial figures in the history of the conflict in Northern Ireland.

== Early career ==
Wilford was born in Leicestershire. His mother was unmarried and he never knew his father; brought up by his grandparents, for many years he believed them to be his parents and his mother to be his sister. He was educated at Loughborough College School, where his fees were paid for by an unknown benefactor: there he excelled at Latin, Greek and Drama, winning the School Prize and declining a place offered to him by the Royal Academy of Dramatic Arts (RADA), although he retained his passion for Shakespearean theatre and the classics. Called up for National Service in 1952, he attended the Army Officers’ school at Eaton Hall in Cheshire, being commissioned into the Leicestershire Regiment. A year later in 1953, he was deployed to Malaysia during the ‘Malayan Emergency’ as part of the Malay Regiment, seeing action against Communist insurgents and becoming a counter-insurgency expert. He later did a two-year stint with the 7th Gurkhas, and then served in Cyprus before being posted as an exchange officer to 22 SAS, the elite special operations unit of the British Army, for three years as a liaison to the American 7th Special Forces Group at Fort Bragg. Working with future Delta Force founder Charlie Beckwith, the two became good friends and remained close until Beckwith died in 1994. He later attended Staff College along with two other former SAS officers, and was a top student.

== Northern Ireland and Bloody Sunday ==
In the late 1960s, Wilford was approached by the Parachute Regiment and took up as an officer to command D Company of 2 Para, which he led in Anguilla and Northern Ireland soon after the beginning of the Troubles. In the early 1970s he was promoted to Lieutenant Colonel of 1 Para, and was in command when his men shot dead 11 civilians in Ballymurphy in August 1971 after the introduction of internment by Brian Faulkner's government during Operation Demetrius. Wilford was again in command when his troops shot a further 26 unarmed civilian protesters on 30 January 1972 after they were deployed to the Bogside area of Derry during Operation Forecast on the orders of Land Forces Commander, General Robert Ford, to arrest local members of a perceived youth gang during a civil rights march. In an incident that became known as "Bloody Sunday", the paratroopers would open fire on innocent civilians, killing 13 of them with a 14th victim later dying of their wounds.

=== Investigations ===
The Widgery tribunal, which was formed to investigate the Bloody Sunday massacre that April, attached no blame to Wilford for his role in the day's events. On 3 October 1972 he was appointed an Officer of the Order of the British Empire (OBE). This act was interpreted as both a reward for his part in Bloody Sunday and a gesture of solidarity for him by the British establishment. However, the Saville Inquiry, many years later, determined that Wilford had expressly disobeyed an order from a superior officer, Brigadier Pat MacLellan, who prohibited Wilford from sending troops into the Bogside. The Saville Inquiry found that MacLellan was not to blame for the shootings. Lord Saville said Colonel Wilford was wrong to send soldiers into an unfamiliar area where there was a risk of attack from Irish republican paramilitaries, in circumstances where the soldiers' response would risk civilians being killed or injured.

Saville suggested Wilford "wanted to demonstrate the way to deal with rioters in Derry was not for soldiers to shelter behind barricades like (as he put it) Aunt Sallies while being stoned, as he perceived the local troops had been doing, but instead to go aggressively after rioters, as he and his soldiers had been doing in Belfast". He added: "His failure to comply with his orders, instead setting in train the very thing his brigadier has prohibited him from doing, cannot be justified...Colonel Wilford should not have launched an incursion into the Bogside."

== Aftermath ==
Wilford was known locally in Derry in the aftermath as the 'Butcher of the Bogside'. On 4 November 1972, he captured the Ulster Volunteer Force leader Gusty Spence, then on the run from prison. His final posting after the end of his tenure as OC of 1 Para was with NATO in Belgium, and although he retired as a full Colonel in 1983 he reportedly felt bitter at ending his career only one rank higher than his 1972 rank, which he believed was due to being repeatedly passed over for promotion.

Wilford had claimed he had been made a scapegoat since Bloody Sunday and had been abandoned by the military hierarchy and British Government. He was outspoken in criticising his leadership and always defended the actions of his soldiers since the incident. He maintained his soldiers were fired upon first and in 1992 in a BBC documentary he stated "I don't believe my soldiers were wrong", reasoning "If you get into an enormous crowd which is out to make mischief you are in the first instance a party to it." In 1998 he stated he was angry at Tony Blair's intention of setting up the Saville Inquiry and that he should not apologise for it. In 1999, speaking on BBC radio he "suggest[ed] that almost all Northern Ireland Catholics were closet republicans". This reportedly angered the family members of some victims. He later apologised for his comments, yet "the army distanced itself from him".

== Later years ==
By 2000, Wilford was living outside the United Kingdom. According to the Derry Journal, as of 2010, he had been living in Belgium for a number of years with his new wife and daughter. In the wake of the release of the Saville report, he had refused to make any further comments, stating "I don't want to talk about it. It's all been said."

In 2010, he was incorrectly reported by RTÉ and the BBC to have died.

Wilford died following Parkinson's disease in Belgium on 24 November 2023, at the age of 90.
