= Trial of Soldier F =

Trial of British soldier

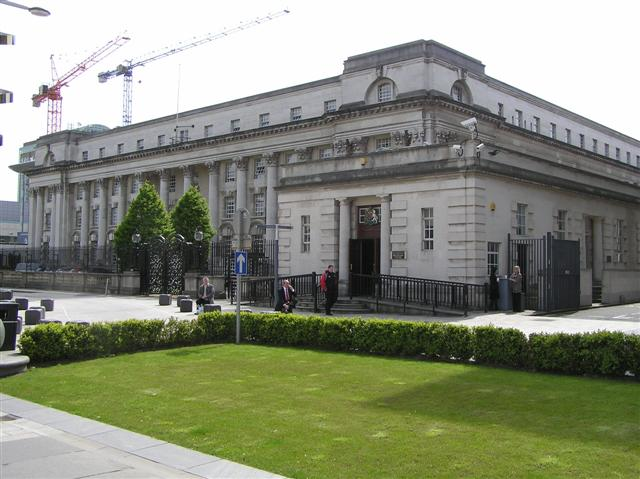
- Royal Courts of Justice, Belfast
- Court: Belfast Crown Court
- Started: 15 September 2025
- Decided: 23 October 2025
- Verdict: Not guilty
- Charge: Murder (2 counts); Attempted murder (5 counts)

Case history
- Related cases: Widgery inquiry Saville Inquiry

Court membership
- Judge sitting: Patrick Lynch

On 15 September 2025 at Belfast Crown Court, the former British paratrooper known as "Soldier F" went on trial for the murder of William McKinney and James Wray, as well as five counts of attempted murder (regarding Patrick O'Donnell, Joseph Friel, Joe Mahon, Michael Quinn and an unknown person) during a civil rights march in Derry, Northern Ireland, on 30 January 1972, an event that became known as Bloody Sunday. The defendant, who was screened from public view by a black curtain, pleaded not guilty to all charges before judge Patrick Lynch at the non-jury court. The actual identity of "Soldier F" has often not been revealed in published material about the trial, and is not included in this Wikipedia article.

The 2010 Saville Inquiry concluded that there was "no doubt" Soldier F had shot Michael Kelly, Patrick Doherty and Barney McGuigan (in the back of the head as he went to help Doherty) and that they were all unarmed. At the Inquiry, Soldier F admitted that he shot the three victims, but claimed they were petrol bombers or had a weapon. However, evidence from the Inquiry was inadmissible for the murder trial.

Regarding the attention the trial attracted, Lynch highlighted a Twitter post by loyalist blogger Jamie Bryson that caused him "concerns" under the Contempt of Court Act, remarking that if the trial had been taking place in front of a jury it could have led to a mistrial application. After Bryson then attempted to submit a letter to Lynch personally regarding the case, it was announced that the matter had been referred to the Director of Public Prosecutions to consider if there had been any contempt of court regarding this inappropriate attempt to communicate with a trial judge.

On 23 October 2025, Soldier F was found not guilty on all charges.

== Opening statements ==
Prosecutor Louis Mably described to the court how a group of soldiers, including "Soldier F", had opened fire on a group of unarmed civilians in Glenfada Park North area of the Bogside as they began to run away, and that McKinney and Wray were killed while several others were injured. Mably asserted that statements recorded by the Royal Military Police in the aftermath placed "Soldier F" at the scene and that he had also fired his service weapon during the incident. All of the dead and wounded had gunshot wounds either in the back or their sides, Mably added, while informing the court that Joe Mahon, Michael Quinn and Joseph Friel would be taking the stand to give eyewitness evidence for the prosecution around the circumstances of how they were shot on the day in question.

== Admissibility of Royal Military Police statements ==
Legal arguments regarding the admissibility of the statements recorded by the Royal Military Police, specifically regarding hearsay applications by the prosecution, took up most of the second day of the trial. According to Mably, the non-voluntary statements made by "Soldier G" and "Soldier H" in 1972 (which they were ordered to make without a right to counsel) were the only evidence capable of proving "Soldier F" opened fire on civilians, as "Soldier G" died a number of years ago while "Soldier H" had refused to testify in court. "Soldier H", who previously admitted to firing 22 bullets on the day in question, had additionally informed authorities via his legal representative that if he was forced to attend the trial he would exercise his right to silence to avoid self-incrimination. In the statements, "Soldier G" described firing aimed shots at what he believed to be two armed individuals (possibly carrying M1 carbine rifles) in the Glenfada Park North area, and that "Soldier F" simultaneously opened fire also. "Soldier G" targeted one of the men with three shots, and saw him fall to the ground, while the other man likewise collapsed when "Soldier F" fired his weapon. "Soldier H" had claimed in his statement to have fired shots at a person who he believed to be armed with a nail bomb, while he witnessed "Soldier F" firing his rifle at a man in the south-west corner of the square during the same incident.

In response, Mark Mulholland for the defence argued that since they could not test the veracity and accuracy of the statements provided by "Soldier G" and "Soldier H", they should not be introduced as evidence. Mulholland asserted that "Soldier H" had given different accounts of the incident in Glenfada Park North over the years, some of which contained inconsistencies and lies in an effort to justify his own firing of live ammunition on that day, adding that it was possible that "Soldier G" and "Soldier H" had colluded with each other to incriminate "Soldier F" before making their statements.

On 24 September 2025, judge Patrick Lynch announced that after careful consideration he had decided that the statements from "Soldier G" and "Soldier H" should be admitted into evidence.

== Prosecution evidence ==
=== Victim statements ===
Starting on 1 October 2025, witnesses who had been shot on Bloody Sunday gave evidence for the prosecution. Joe Mahon testified to the court how he had been at the civil rights march on the day in question and had escaped into Glenfada Park with a number of other people after hearing reports of people being shot on Roseville Street. He then witnessed some British soldiers entering Glenfada Park North, one of whom began shooting from the hip side to side in his direction. Mahon was shot in the pelvis, and ended up on the ground beside William McKinney and James Wray. As the soldier who opened fire began walking across the square towards them, Mahon claimed to have heard someone say "pretend you are dead", and that when James Wray started to move this soldier opened fire twice on Wray as he lay on the ground and then said to a colleague "I’ve got another one". Mahon told the court he remembered which soldier had shot him as he wore a different colour of combat jacket to the other soldiers, and that when he removed his helmet to wipe sweat off his forehead he noticed he had short blond hair. Mahon later saw this soldier in a news clip, and when the video was played to the court he pointed out the soldier who he believed had shot him in Glenfada Park. Joseph Friel gave testimony to the court how he also witnessed a soldier shooting from the hip in Glenfada Park North, and that he had been hit in the chest by a single bullet after a burst of three rounds had been fired in his direction. Michael Quinn described to the court how he ran from William Street into Glenfada Park North after soldiers opened fire on protestors, and that he was aware of sustained gunfire coming from the Rossville Street area. When more soldiers entered Glenfada Park, Quinn tried to exit into Abbey Park when a bullet grazed his shoulder and pierced his cheekbone, before finally exiting from his nose. A statement from Patrick O'Donnell, who died in 2005, was also read out to the court, where he described being present in Glenfada Park North when he was shot in the shoulder.

=== Eyewitness statements ===
Eyewitnesses who were not directly involved in the shootings also gave sworn testimony to the court. Derek McFeely described how he had attended the civil rights march and was standing on William Street when a person beside him was shot by British soldiers. After helping carry him to safety, McFeely then went into Glenfada Park thinking he would be safe there, where he saw a group of soldiers running in and then opening fire. John Shiels also attended the march and took shelter in a flat in Glenfada Park after disorder broke out. Shiels testified how he was looking out the window of the flat when he saw a soldier enter the court yard and then fire a shot at an unarmed person who was running away, and that person then fell to the ground and remained motionless. Malachy Coyle told the court how he and another man had run into the backyard of a house on Glenfada Park North to escape gunfire, and that while looking through slats in the garden fence he saw soldiers entering the courtyard. Coyle observed three people lying on the ground, and the man closest to him (who was later identified as James Wray) called out that he couldn't feel his legs, and fearing for the man's safety Coyle said to him "don't move, pretend you're dead". Coyle then heard another gunshot, seen the spark of a bullet ricochet on the pavement under the man, and finally saw the man slump down with a groan. Coyle then witnessed a soldier shout "I am going to shoot you, you Irish bastards" at a group of men running away, before he then opened fire on them. Coyle and the other man thereafter emerged from the backyard with their hands on their heads.

=== Soldiers' statements ===
On 7 October, the original statements given to the Royal Military Police by the colleagues of "Soldier F" in the early hours of 31 January 1972 were read out to the court. "Soldier G" claimed that he and "Soldier F" came under fire from a gunman in the Rossville flats at around 4pm on the day in question, and after moving up the street he spotted an armed individual at the end of an alleyway. He then ran into Glenfada Park along with "Soldier F", where they observed two men armed with rifles on the far side of the courtyard. Both he and "Soldier F" opened fire and the two men collapsed to the ground, then bystanders grabbed the men's rifles and ran off down an alleyway. "Soldier G" briefly chased these individuals, before being ordered back to Rossville Street. "Soldier H" told the RMP how he had entered Glenfada Park with "Soldier F" and "Soldier G", when he observed three young men holding nail bombs. "Soldier H" fired two rounds at the youth in the middle of the group, while "Soldier F" and "Soldier G" also opened fire at them, and the other two fell to the ground along with the individual he opened fire on. "Soldier H" claimed another youth then suddenly ran over and took an object from the group on the ground, and when he tried to run off "Soldier H" fired a shot that struck him on the shoulder. Statements from "Soldier E", who was serving as a corporal from 1 Para on the day in question, were submitted to the court also. "Soldier E" described leading a 'four-man brick' of paratroopers from the junction of William Street and Rossville Street into Glenfada Park North, where they came under attack from both petrol bomb and nail bombs. "Soldier E" admitted firing two shots at a man about to throw a nail bomb in his direction, and seen one round hitting him in the chest. "Soldier E" recalled there was a lot of additional gunfire in the court yard at the time, and he witnessed two other individuals collapse to the ground.

Statements given to the Saville Inquiry by "Soldier H" were also submitted as evidence, where he described standing outside a church when a gunman suddenly opened fire on him, after which he entered Glenfada Park North with a number of other soldiers. "Soldier H" claimed that he had a nail bomb thrown at him, and then observed a young man throwing a "smoking object" in his direction, which in response he fired two aimed shots at the youth. Because he was concentrating on hitting the target, he had no awareness of others in the court yard and no recollection of the actions of "Soldier G" and "Soldier F" regarding them opening fire or not. "Soldier H" went onto narrate how he spotted a rifle barrel sticking out of window with frosted glass, and that he fired a total of 19 rounds at the window hoping to hit the shape moving behind the glass. "Soldier H" asserted that since he was totally concentrating on engaging this sniper, he could not see what "Soldier G" and "Soldier F" were doing during this time period.

=== Conclusion of evidence ===
The prosecution concluded its evidence by asserting to the court that during post-mortem examinations on McKinney and Wray, forensic tests looking for firearm or explosives residue both came back negative. It was also revealed that "Soldier F" was interviewed twice by police in 2016, and after his lawyer read a short statement he then refused to answer any questions. Defence lawyers then informed the judge that they would be launching a no case to answer application when the trial resumed the following week.

== Defence submissions ==
On 13 October, defence lawyer Mark Mulholland argued that the hearsay evidence admitted into the trial was "fundamentally inconsistent". Mulholland further described "Soldier H" as an unreliable witness who had altered his account multiple times and refused to testify or be cross-examined. He also criticised the credibility of "Soldier G"'s statements, which he said were self-contradictory regarding who fired first in Glenfada Park North. Civilian testimony, Mulholland asserted, supported the claim that all shooting in that area was carried out by the first soldier to arrive, "Soldier G".

In response, prosecution lawyer Louis Mably maintained that there was a case for "Soldier F" to answer. He acknowledged inconsistencies in the soldiers’ statements but attributed them to how they were recorded by the Royal Military Police. Mably argued that a "core of consistency" remained: both sets of statements implicated "Soldier F" in opening fire, and civilian evidence did not support the claim that only one soldier had fired.

On 16 October, Judge Patrick Lynch ruled that the trial should proceed and declined to direct a verdict of not guilty. He invited the defence to present its case, but Mulholland stated that "Soldier F" would not testify or be cross-examined, nor would any other defence evidence be introduced. Lynch warned that the court could draw an adverse inference from this refusal, a point echoed by Mably, who called it implausible that "Soldier F" had no memory of whether he fired with intent to kill.

== Verdict ==
On 23 October, Lynch ruled that "Soldier F" was not guilty and acquitted him of all charges, stating that "evidence presented by the Crown falls way short of standard" to prove guilt beyond reasonable doubt. He highlighted how statements from "Soldier H" and "Soldier G" could not be relied upon as they had both committed perjury at previous legal inquiries, and they potentially had ulterior motives to name "Soldier F" as a participant in their own murderous activities on the day in question.

In a response to a parliamentary question from Colum Eastwood, it was revealed that the UK government had spent over £4 million on the legal defence of "Soldier F", much of which related to legal fees but also included the costs of flights and accommodation for the former paratrooper.

== Public naming ==
Soldier F was granted anonymity by a judge concluding that "a real risk does exist" to Soldier F's life and that he was right to "feel genuine fear".

SDLP leader Colum Eastwood controversially used parliamentary privilege to name Soldier F in the House of Commons on 13 July 2021, stating that "for 50 years he has been granted anonymity and now the government want to grant him an amnesty", and that "no one involved in murder during the Troubles should be granted an amnesty". Eastwood stated that he received death threats for doing so. Lindsay Hoyle, Speaker of the House of Commons, said that Eastwood "broke no rules" in doing so. Soldier F's name "appeared on the Bogside's iconic Free Derry Corner and was widely known in Derry" when Eastwood named him.

On 9 February 2022, Peadar Tóibín named Soldier F in the Dáil Éireann, stating that "we need to make sure that people know" the names of "the alphabet of British Army perpetrators of murder". Dáil privilege protects him from being sued for defamation.

News media such as the BBC and The Journal did not name Soldier F for legal reasons.
