= Bloody Sunday (1972) =

Mass shooting in Derry, Northern Ireland

- Part of the Troubles
- Catholic priest Edward Daly waving a blood-stained white handkerchief as a white flag while trying to escort the mortally wounded Jackie Duddy to safety
- Location: 54°59′49″N 07°19′32″W; Derry, (Note: There is a longstanding Derry/Londonderry name dispute. This article follows the approach that Derry refers to the city and County Londonderry refers to the county (outside of organisations' names, which may follow their own approaches).) Northern Ireland
- Date: 30 January 1972; 54 years ago 16:10 (UTC+00:00)
- Attack type: Mass shooting
- Weapon: L1A1 SLR rifles
- Deaths: 14 (13 immediate, one died four months later)
- Injuries: 15+ (12 from gunshots, two from vehicle impact, others from rubber bullets and flying debris)
- Perpetrator: British Army (Parachute Regiment)
- Accused: "Soldier F"
- Charges: murder (2); attempted murder (5)

Bloody Sunday, or the Bogside Massacre, occurred on 30 January 1972 when British soldiers shot 26 unarmed civilians during a protest march in the Bogside area of Derry, Northern Ireland. Thirteen men were killed outright, while the death of another man four months later has been attributed to his gunshot injuries. Many of the victims were shot while fleeing from the soldiers and some were shot while trying to help the wounded. All of those shot were Catholics. The march had been organised by the Northern Ireland Civil Rights Association (NICRA) to protest against internment without trial. The soldiers were from the 1st Battalion of the Parachute Regiment ("1 Para"), the same battalion implicated in the Ballymurphy massacre several months earlier.

The incident became one of the most significant events of the Troubles. It was the highest number of people killed in a single shooting during the conflict and is regarded as the worst mass shooting in Northern Irish history. Bloody Sunday fuelled Catholic and Irish nationalist hostility towards the British Army, intensified the conflict and led to a surge of support for the Provisional Irish Republican Army (IRA), especially in Derry. The Republic of Ireland held a national day of mourning and crowds besieged and burnt down the chancery of the British Embassy in Dublin.

Two investigations were held by the Government of the United Kingdom. The Widgery Tribunal, conducted shortly after the event, largely accepted the soldiers' accounts and was widely criticised as a whitewash. In 1998, the Saville Inquiry was established to reinvestigate the killings. Its 2010 report concluded that the shootings were "unjustified" and "unjustifiable", that none of those shot posed a threat and that soldiers had given false accounts to justify their actions. British prime minister David Cameron formally apologised on behalf of the United Kingdom.

Following the Saville Report, police opened a murder investigation. One former soldier was charged; after a series of legal challenges the case was resumed. In 2025, the former paratrooper known as "Soldier F" went on trial for two murders and five attempted murders and was found not guilty.

== Background ==
The City of Derry was widely regarded by many Catholics and Irish nationalists in Northern Ireland as emblematic of what they described as "fifty years of Unionist misrule". Although the city had a nationalist majority, gerrymandering ensured that elections to the City Corporation consistently returned a unionist majority. Derry was also perceived to have been deprived of public investment: motorways were not extended to the city, a new university was established in the smaller (Protestant-majority) town of Coleraine rather than in Derry (see University for Derry Committee), and the city's housing stock was generally in poor condition. As a result, Derry became a major focus of the civil rights campaign led by organisations such as the Northern Ireland Civil Rights Association (NICRA) in the late 1960s. It was the scene of the major riot known as the Battle of the Bogside in August 1969, which prompted the Northern Ireland administration to request military support.

Although many Catholics initially welcomed the British Army as a neutral force – in contrast to the Royal Ulster Constabulary (RUC), which was widely regarded as a sectarian police force – relations deteriorated rapidly.

In response to rising levels of violence across Northern Ireland, internment without trial was introduced on 9 August 1971. Disorder broke out across the region following its introduction and 21 people were killed in three days of violence. In Belfast, soldiers of the Parachute Regiment shot dead 11 civilians in what became known as the Ballymurphy massacre. On 10 August, Bombardier Paul Challenor became the first soldier to be killed by the Provisional Irish Republican Army (Provisional IRA) in Derry, when he was shot by a sniper in the Creggan housing estate. A month after internment was introduced, a British soldier shot dead a 14-year-old Catholic schoolgirl, Annette McGavigan, in Derry. Two months later, Kathleen Thompson, a 47-year-old mother of six, was shot dead in her back garden in Derry by the British Army.

IRA activity also increased across Northern Ireland, with 30 British soldiers killed in the remaining months of 1971, compared with 10 in the period before internment. A further six soldiers had been killed in Derry by the end of 1971. At least 1,332 rounds were fired at the British Army, which also faced 211 explosions and 180 nail bombs, and returned fire with 364 rounds. Both the Provisional IRA and the Official IRA had erected barricades and established no-go areas for the British Army and RUC in Derry.

By the end of 1971, 29 barricades were in place to prevent access to what became known as Free Derry, 16 of which were impassable even to the British Army's one-ton armoured vehicles. IRA members openly mounted roadblocks in front of the media, and daily clashes occurred between nationalist youths and the British Army at a location known as "aggro corner". Rioting and incendiary attacks caused an estimated £4 million worth of damage to local businesses.

=== Lead-up to the march ===
On 18 January 1972, the Northern Irish Prime Minister, Brian Faulkner, banned all parades and marches in the region until the end of the year. Four days later, in defiance of the ban, an anti-internment march was held at Magilligan strand, near Derry. Protesters marched towards an internment camp but were stopped by soldiers of the Parachute Regiment. When some protesters threw stones and attempted to move around the barbed wire, paratroopers drove them back by firing rubber bullets at close range and making baton charges. Several protesters were badly beaten and some paratroopers had to be physically restrained by their own officers. Allegations of brutality were widely reported on television and in the press, and some within the British Army believed that excessive force had been used.

NICRA announced another anti‑internment march in Derry on 30 January. It was to go from Bishop's Field, in the Creggan housing estate, to the Guildhall in the city centre, where an anti-internment rally was planned. In consultation with Brigadier Pat MacLellan, the army commander in the city, Chief Superintendent Frank Lagan of the RUC suggested that no action be taken against marchers save photographing the organisers with a view to prosecuting them later. His views reached Major General Robert Ford, Commander of Land Forces in Northern Ireland. The final decision was taken by a "higher authority": the march would be allowed to go ahead but contained "within the general area of the Bogside and the Creggan Estate so as to prevent rioting in the City centre and damage to commercial premises and shops". MacLellan's tactical plan saw this containment being achieved by 26 sequentially numbered barriers cutting off all streets leading from the march route to the Guildhall. No action was to be taken if the march stayed within the Creggan and Bogside. Should violence occur, an arrest force was to scoop-up as many rioters as possible. Any arrest operation was only to be launched on the specific order of the brigadier, when rioters and marchers ”were clearly separated". Ford ordered 1 Para to be deployed to Derry, under MacLellan's command, as a reserve force to arrest rioters. The arrest operation was codenamed "Operation Forecast". The Saville Report later criticised Ford for selecting the Parachute Regiment, noting that it had "a reputation for using excessive physical violence". March organiser and MP Ivan Cooper had been assured beforehand that no armed IRA members would be near the march, although Tony Geraghty wrote that some of the stewards were probably IRA members.

== Events of the day ==
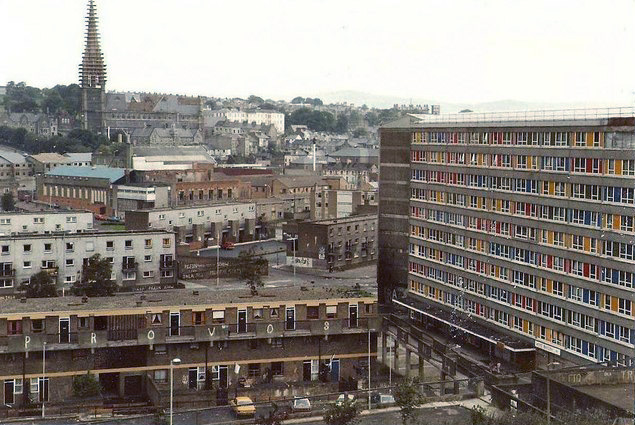
The Bogside in 1981, overlooking the area where many of the victims were shot. On the right of the picture is the south side of Rossville Flats and in the middle distance is Glenfada Park.

Approximate locations of those killed on the day
1 Jackie Duddy
2 Michael Kelly
3 Michael McDaid
4 John Young
5 William Nash
6 Kevin McElhinney
7 Hugh Gilmour
8 James Wray
9 William McKinney
10 Gerard McKinney
11 Gerald Donaghey
12 Patrick Doherty
13 Bernard McGuigan

Paratroopers arrived in Derry on the morning of the march and took up positions. MacLellan was the operational commander and issued orders from Ebrington Barracks. He gave orders to Lieutenant Colonel Derek Wilford, commander of 1 Para, who in turn gave orders to Major Ted Loden, the officer commanding the company that would launch any arrest operation.

The march formed up behind a coal delivery lorry carrying the main speakers and bearing a Northern Ireland Civil Rights Association (NICRA) banner. It set off at about 2:45 pm, with many joining along the route until there were 10,000–15,000 people present in the Bogside, many more than the 3,000 to 5,000 noted by Widgery. It proceeded along William Street but, as it neared the city centre, found the route ahead blocked by British Army barriers. The organisers redirected the march to the right down Rossville Street, intending to hold the rally at Free Derry Corner instead. Despite the efforts of stewards to guide the marchers to follow the lorry, quite a large number broke away and carried on along William Street towards Barrier 14, just past the junction with Chamberlain Street. The crowd jeered soldiers and RUC men, then began to thin out as youths started to throw stones and missiles at soldiers manning the barrier; the troops responded with rubber bullets and CS gas. When sheets of corrugated iron were used as shields by rioters, soldiers drenched them with purple-dyed water from a water-cannon. A canister of CS gas thrown from the crowd exploded in front of the water cannon. Missiles were also thrown at soldiers manning Barrier 12 in Little James Street. Such clashes between soldiers and youths were common, and observers reported that the rioting was no more violent than usual.

Paratroopers were sent forward from the area of a Presbyterian church to cover the cutting of barbed wire for a possible outflanking scoop-up movement through Barrier 12. They were spotted in a disused taxi depot in William Street and pelted with stones and bottles. At about 3:55 pm, two paratroopers opened fire at civilians on waste ground opposite that building. The first shots fired on Bloody Sunday injured two people. The first was 15-year-old Damien Donaghy, who had been throwing stones and whom the soldiers claimed to be holding a black cylindrical object. Also wounded was 59-year-old John Johnston, an uninvolved passer-by (despite soldiers later testifying before Lord Widgery that nail bombs had been and were about to be thrown). Johnston, who was hit twice, died 4½ months later. The Saville Inquiry found that neither man was armed. Shortly afterwards, a single high-velocity rifle shot was fired by a member of the Official IRA, narrowly missed the wire-cutting party and striking a drainpipe on the Presbyterian church.

At 3:55 Lt-Col Derek Wilford, commanding 1 Para, requested permission to "deploy sub-unit through barricade 14 to pick up yobbos in William Street/Little James Street". MacLellan's reply, sent at 4:07, read: "Orders given to 1 Para at 1607 for one sub-unit of 1 Para to do scoop-up op through barrier 14. Not to conduct running battle down Rossville Street". At approximately 4:09 pm, a convoy of ten army vehicles carrying the battalion's Support Company and its officers moved through Barrier 12 towards the Bogside and was photographed on waste ground off Rossville Street at 4:10 pm. These troops were followed at about 4:11 pm by colleagues from a different company, who entered through Barrier 14 on foot and in armoured vehicles. In contravention of MacLellan's order, which envisaged an operation on foot through Barrier 14 only, and with a gap between rioters and peaceful marchers, army vehicles chased people down Rossville Street and further into the Bogside. The separation desired between rioters and peaceful marchers had not been achieved. By this stage, although some rioters remained at Barrier 14, most had drifted away. Rossville Street and the waste ground to the north of the Rossville Flats contained many stragglers from the march, as well as onlookers. The British Army coming much further than usual into the Bogside caused some panic amongst the crowd, some of whom fled down Rossville Street towards Free Derry Corner, whilst a large group was caught in the courtyard of the flats which was surrounded on three sides by high‑rise buildings.

Paratroopers opened fire with baton rounds immediately upon disembarking from two APCs that drove into the waste ground in front of the flats. There were numerous claims of soldiers beating people, striking them with rifle butts, firing rubber bullets at close range, making threats to kill and hurling abuse. The Saville Report agreed that soldiers "used excessive force when arresting people […] as well as seriously assaulting them for no good reason while in their custody". Two people were also knocked down by army vehicles.

After alighting, Lieutenant "N" fired three warning shots over the heads of a "hostile crowd" forming up at the end of an entry off Chamberlain Street, in order to disperse them; this action was later criticised by the Saville Inquiry. Very soon afterwards soldiers opened fire with live ammunition, killing one civilian and wounding six others. The fatality, Jackie Duddy, was running alongside a priest, Edward Daly, when he was shot in the back.

One group of paratroopers took up position at a low wall on the right-hand side of Rossville Street about 80 yards (73 m) in front of a rubble barricade that stretched across the street. There were people at the barricade and some were throwing stones at the soldiers, but they were not close enough to hit them. The soldiers fired at the barricade, killing six and wounding a seventh.

Another group of civilians fled into the car park of Glenfada Park, which was also surrounded by flats. Here, soldiers fired at people across the car park, about 40–50 yards (35–45 m) away. Two civilians were killed and at least four others wounded. The Saville Report states that it is probable that at least one soldier fired randomly at the crowd from the hip. The paratroopers moved through the car park and out the other side. Some soldiers went to the south‑west corner, where they shot dead two civilians in Abbey Park. Others went to the south‑east corner and shot four more civilians, killing two in the open area between the corner of blocks 1 and 2 of the flats and Joseph Place.

About 10 minutes had elapsed between the time soldiers entered the Bogside and the time the last civilian was shot. More than 100 rounds were fired by the soldiers. No warnings were given before they opened fire.

Some of those shot received first aid from civilian volunteers, either at the scene or after being carried into nearby homes. Among the volunteers were uniformed members of the Order of Malta Ambulance Corps, some of whom were harassed by the paratroopers. The wounded were then driven to hospital, either in civilian cars or in ambulances. The first ambulances arrived at 4:28 pm. The three boys killed at the rubble barricade were taken to hospital by paratroopers. Witnesses said that paratroopers lifted the bodies by the hands and feet and dumped them in the back of their armoured personnel carrier as if they were "pieces of meat". The Saville Report agreed that this was an "accurate description of what happened", adding that the paratroopers "might well have felt themselves at risk, but in our view this does not excuse them".

=== Casualties ===
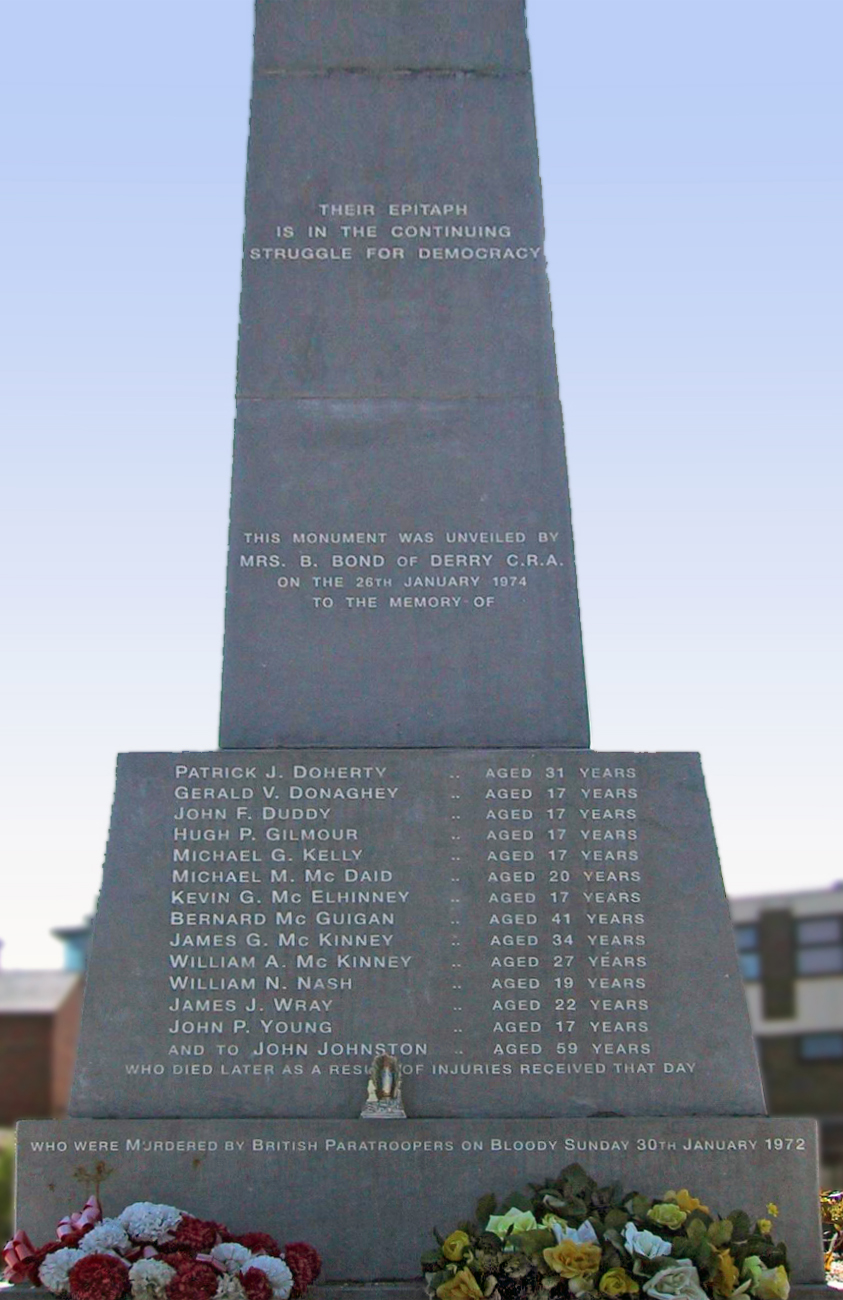
Bloody Sunday memorial in the Bogside

In all, 26 people were shot by the paratroopers; 13 died on the day and another died of his injuries four months later. The dead were killed in four main areas: the car park of Rossville Flats (on the north side of the flats), the rubble barricade across Rossville Street, the car park of Glenfada Park and the forecourt of Rossville Flats (on the south side).

All of the soldiers responsible insisted that they had shot at, and hit, gunmen or bomb‑throwers. No soldier said he missed his target and hit someone else by mistake. The Saville Report concluded that all of those shot were unarmed and that none was posing a serious threat. It also concluded that none of the soldiers fired in response to attacks, or threatened attacks, by gunmen or bomb‑throwers.

The casualties are listed in the order in which they were killed.

- John "Jackie" Duddy, age 17. Shot as he ran away from soldiers in the car park of Rossville Flats. The bullet struck him in the shoulder and entered his chest. Three witnesses said they saw a Paratrooper, probably "Soldier R", take deliberate aim at the youth as he ran. He was the first fatality on Bloody Sunday. Both Saville and Widgery concluded that Duddy was unarmed.
- Michael Kelly, age 17. Shot in the stomach while standing at the rubble barricade on Rossville Street. Both Saville and Widgery concluded that Kelly was unarmed. The Saville Inquiry concluded that "Soldier F" shot Kelly.
- Hugh Gilmour, age 17. Shot as he ran away from soldiers near the rubble barricade. The bullet went through his left elbow and entered his chest. Widgery acknowledged that a photograph taken seconds after Gilmour was hit corroborated witness reports that he was unarmed. The Saville Inquiry concluded that 'Private U' shot Gilmour.
- William "Stiff" Nash, age 19. Shot in the chest at the rubble barricade. Three people were shot while apparently going to his aid, including his father, Alexander Nash, who was wounded – not by "a civilian firing haphazardly in the general direction of the soldiers", as Widgery claimed, but by a British soldier. Nash and the next two victims listed were shot towards the western side of the rubble barricade. "Soldier P" was responsible for at least one of these three deaths, although "Soldier J" and "Soldier E" cannot be ruled out as having taken the life of one each.
- John Young, age 17. Shot in the face at the rubble barricade, apparently while crouching and going to the aid of William Nash.
- Michael McDaid, age 20. Shot in the face at the rubble barricade, apparently while crouching and going to the aid of William Nash.
- Kevin McElhinney, age 17. Shot from behind, near the rubble barricade, while attempting to crawl to safety. He was shot by either "Soldier L" or "Soldier M".
- James Wray, age 22. Shot in the back while running away from soldiers in Glenfada Park courtyard. He was then shot again in the back as he lay mortally wounded on the ground. Witnesses, who were not called to the Widgery Tribunal, stated that Wray was calling out that he could not move his legs before he was shot the second time. The Saville Inquiry found that these shots were fired either by "Soldier G" or "Soldier H", or both.
- William McKinney, age 26. Shot in the back as he attempted to flee through Glenfada Park courtyard. The Saville Inquiry concluded that he was more than likely shot by "Soldier F" or "Soldier H". The bullet that killed him may also have injured Joe Mahon, who survived.
- Gerard McKinney, age 35. Shot in the chest at Abbey Park. A soldier, identified as 'Private G', ran through an alleyway from Glenfada Park and shot him from a few yards away. Witnesses said that when he saw the soldier, McKinney stopped and held up his arms, shouting, "Don't shoot! Don't shoot!", before being shot. The bullet apparently went through his body and struck Gerald Donaghey behind him.
- Gerald Donaghey, (Note: Recorded as such on the family gravestone, the Bloody Sunday memorial, the Saville Inquiry and Pat Finucane Centre, although his name is sometimes incorrectly written as "Gerard Donaghy") age 17. Shot in the stomach at Abbey Park while standing behind Gerard McKinney. Both were apparently struck by the same bullet. Bystanders brought Donaghey to a nearby house. A doctor examined him and his pockets were searched for identification. Two bystanders then attempted to drive Donaghey to hospital, but the car was stopped at a British Army checkpoint. They were ordered to leave the car, which a soldier drove to a regimental aid post, where an Army medical officer pronounced Donaghey dead. Shortly after, the security forces found four nail bombs in his pockets. None of the civilians who searched him, the soldier who drove him to the Army post, or the Army medical officer said that they saw any bombs on Donaghey's person. This led to claims that soldiers had planted the bombs on the youth to justify the killings. (Note: Donaghey was a member of Fianna Éireann, an IRA-linked republican youth movement. Paddy Ward, a police informer, testified at the Saville Inquiry that he gave two nail bombs to Donaghey several hours before he was shot. The Inquiry concluded: the bombs were probably in Donaghey's pockets when he was shot; he was not about to throw a bomb when he was shot; nor was he shot because he had bombs, being shot "while trying to escape from the soldiers".)

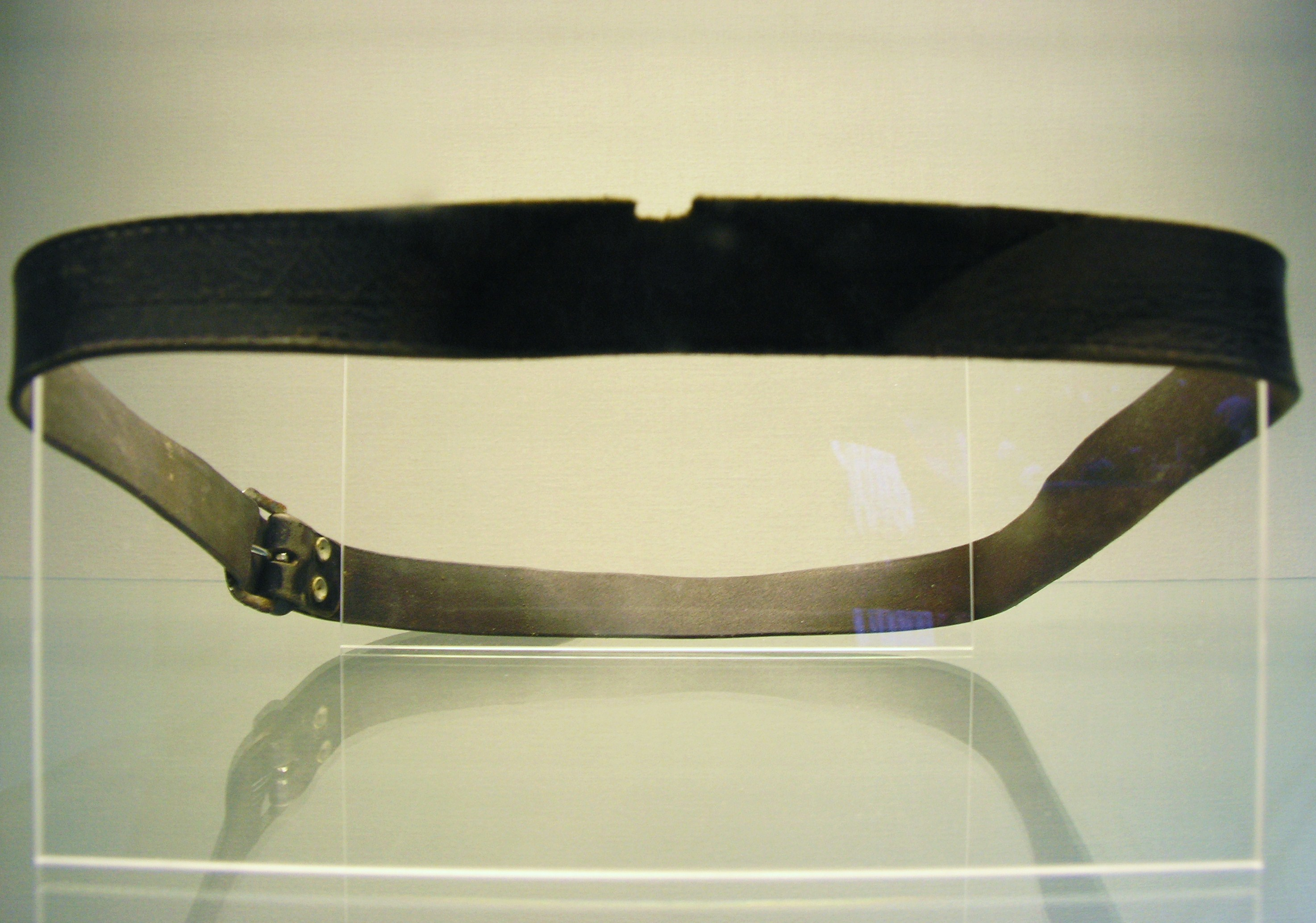
The belt worn by Patrick Doherty. The notch was made by the bullet that killed him.

- Patrick Doherty, age 32. Shot from behind while attempting to crawl to safety in the forecourt of Rossville Flats. The Saville Inquiry concluded that he was shot by "Soldier F", who came out of Glenfada Park. Doherty was photographed, moments before and after he died, by French journalist Gilles Peress. Despite testimony from "Soldier F" that he had shot a man holding a pistol, Widgery acknowledged that the photographs show Doherty was unarmed and that forensic tests on his hands for gunshot residue proved negative.
- Bernard "Barney" McGuigan, age 41. Shot in the back of the head when he walked out from cover to help Patrick Doherty. He had been waving a white handkerchief to indicate his peaceful intentions. The Saville Inquiry concluded that he was shot by "Soldier F".
- John Johnston, age 59. Shot in the leg and left shoulder on William Street 15 minutes before the rest of the shooting started. Johnston was not on the march, but on his way to visit a friend in Glenfada Park. He died on 16 June 1972; his death has been attributed by his family to the injuries he received on the day. He was the only fatality not to die immediately, or soon after being shot.

== Aftermath ==
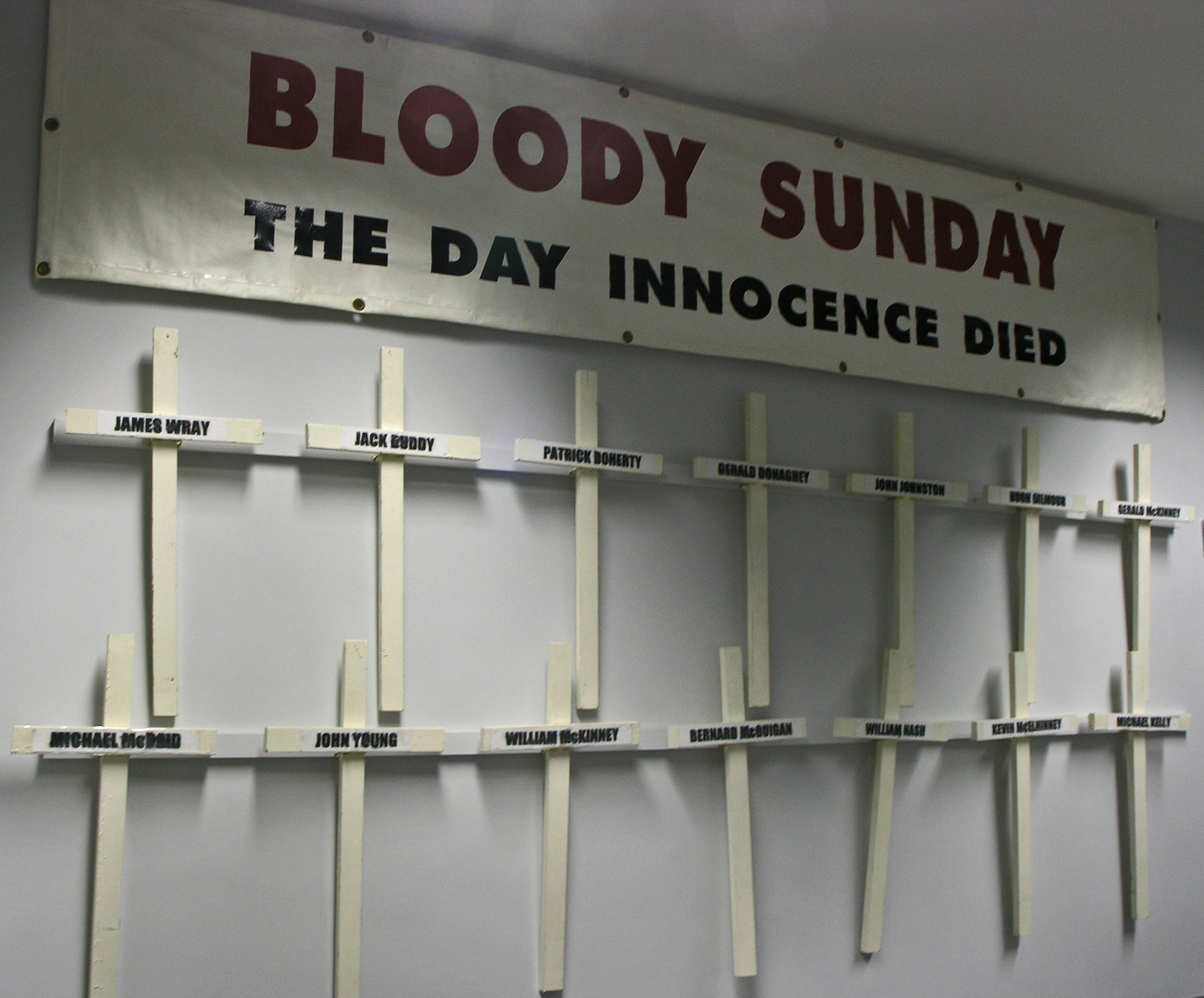
A banner and crosses carried by the families of the victims on the annual commemoration march

Thirteen people were shot and killed, with another wounded man dying subsequently – his family believe from injuries suffered that day. Apart from the soldiers, all eyewitnesses maintain that soldiers fired into an unarmed crowd, or were aiming at fleeing people, and those helping the wounded. No British soldier was wounded by gunfire or bombs, nor were any bullets or nail bombs recovered to support their claims.

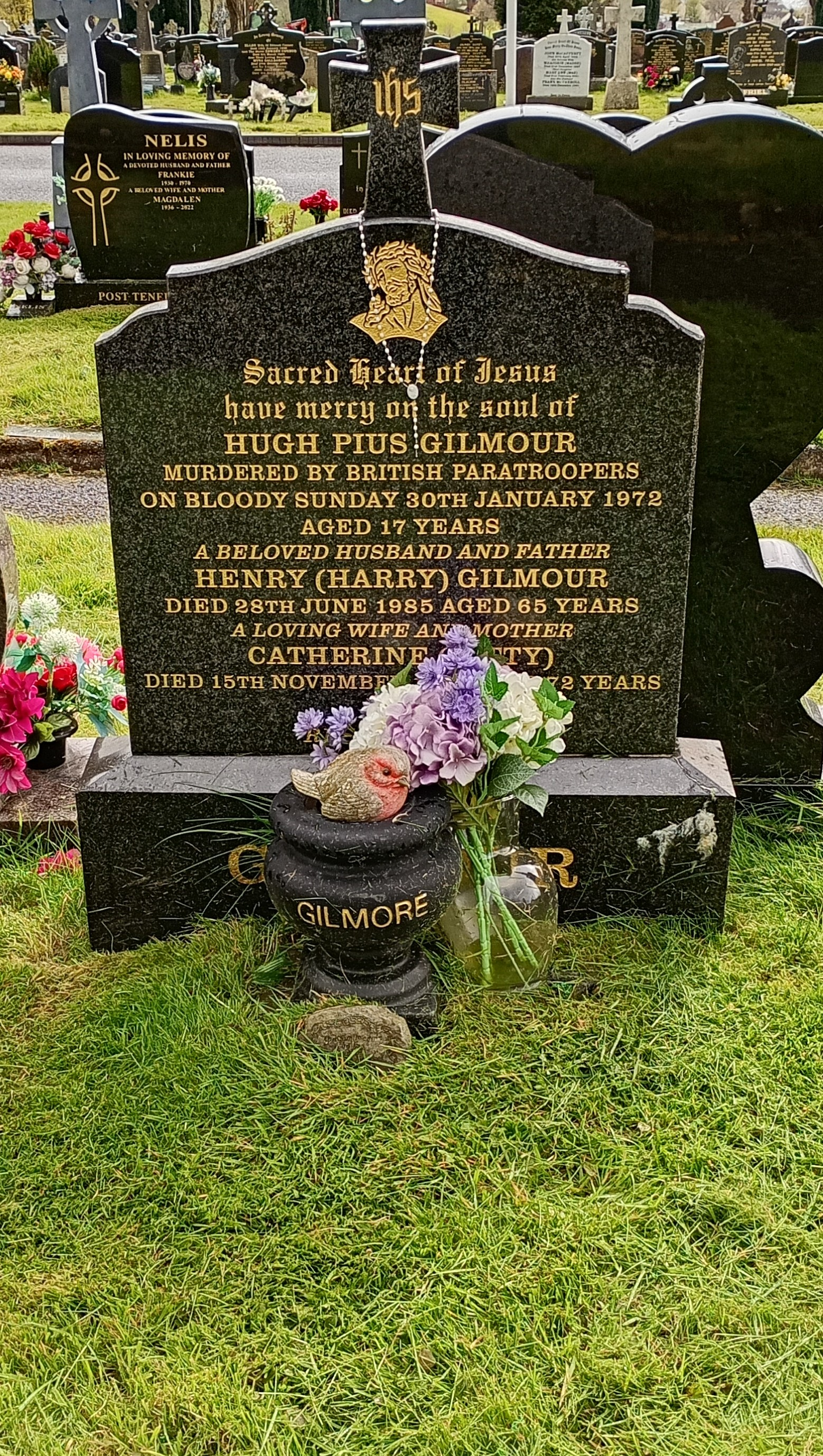
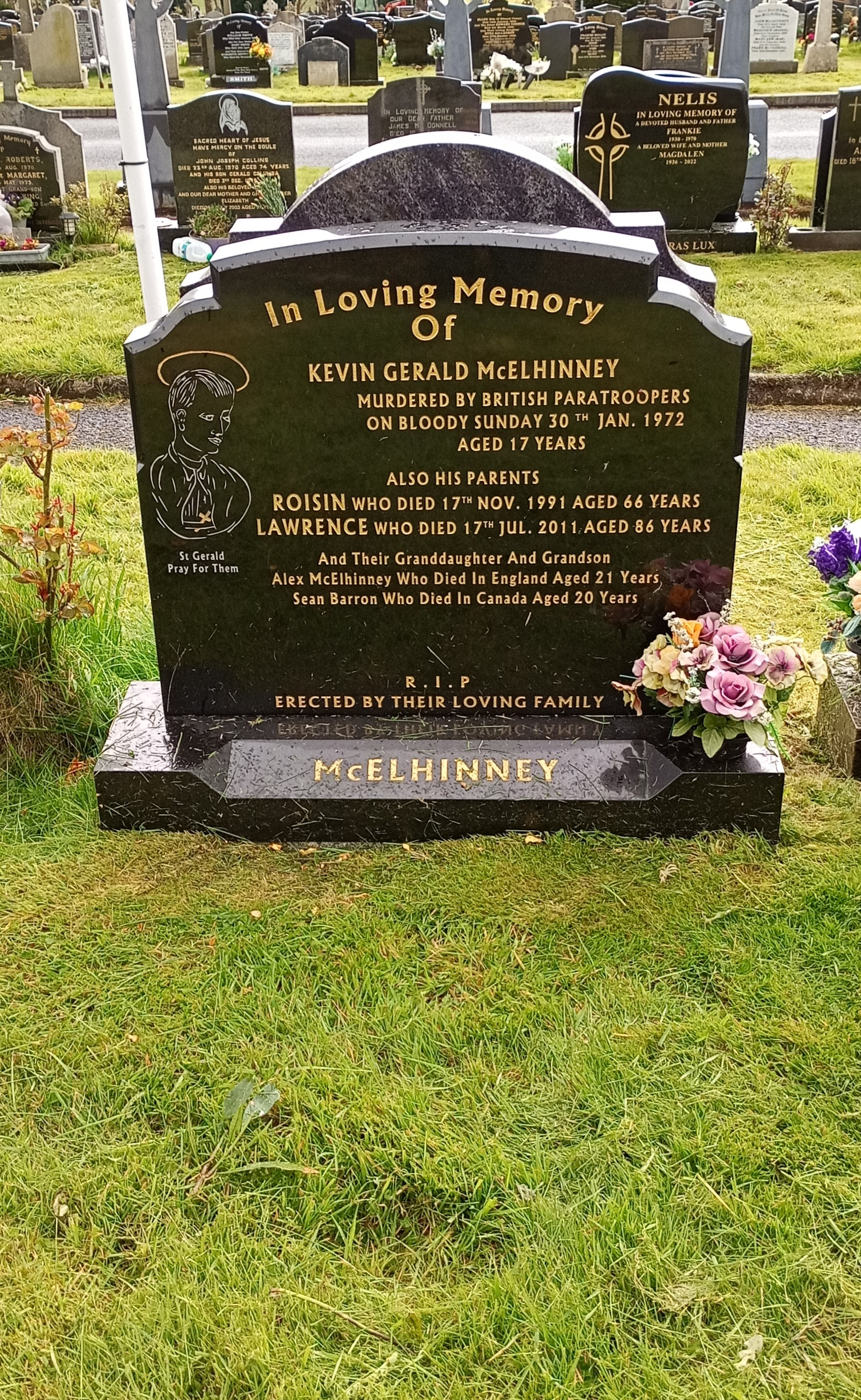
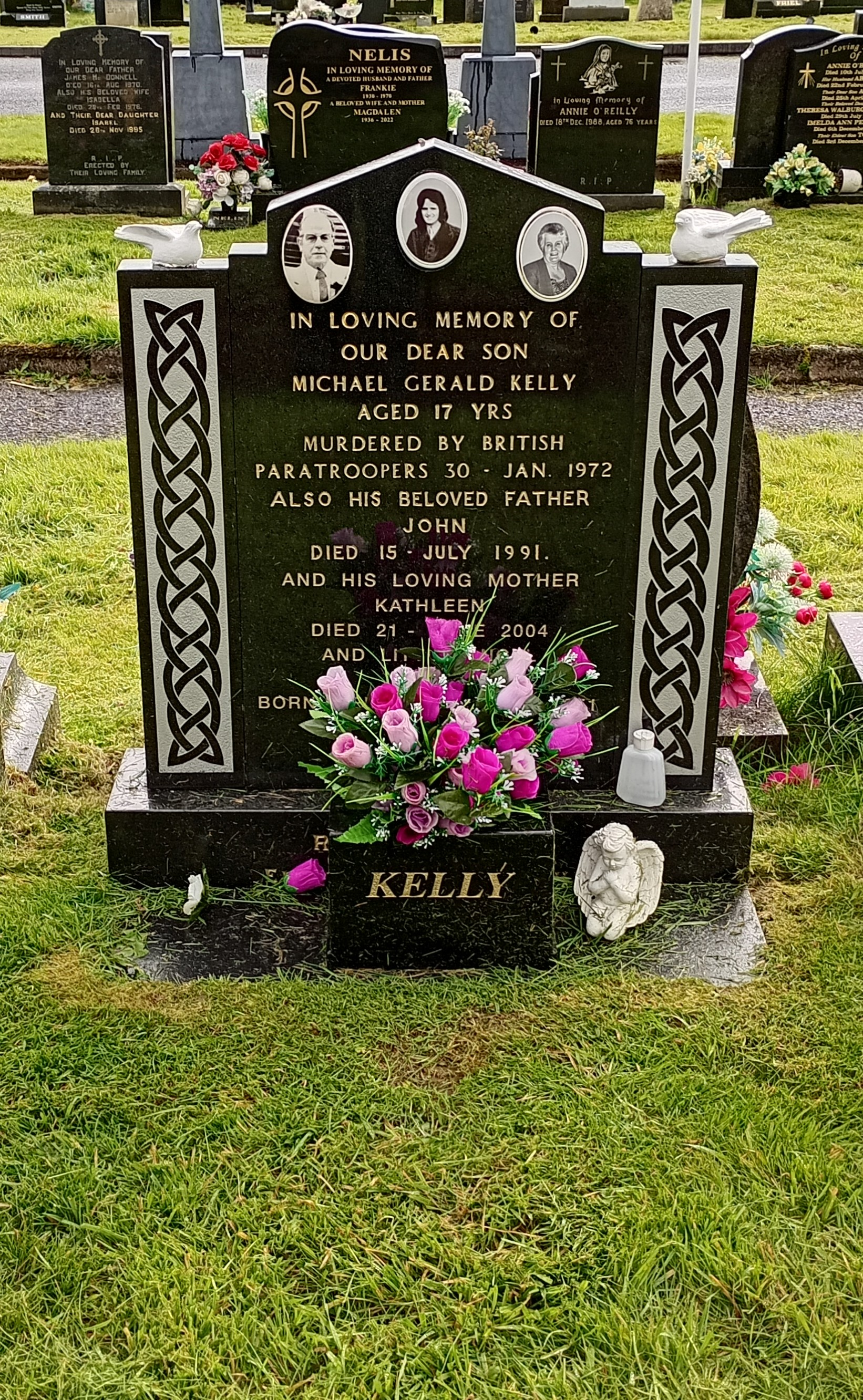
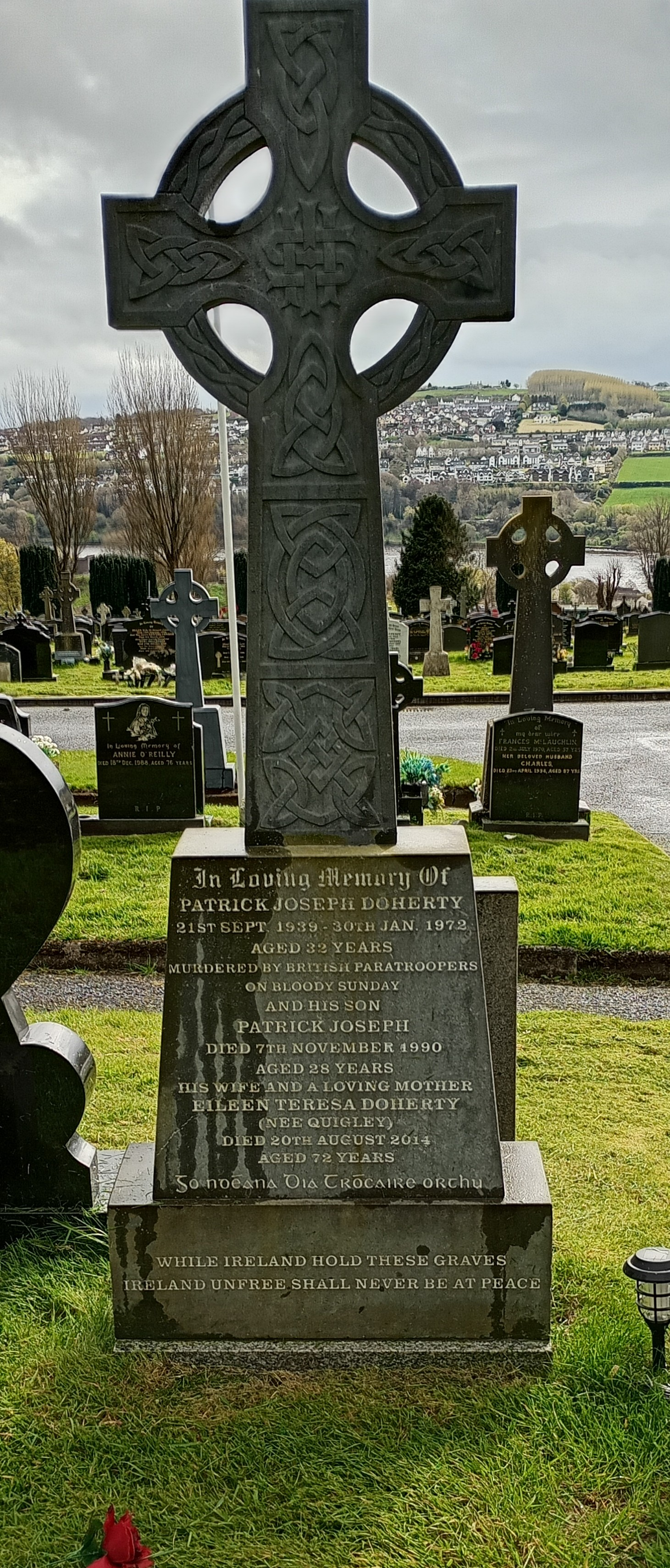
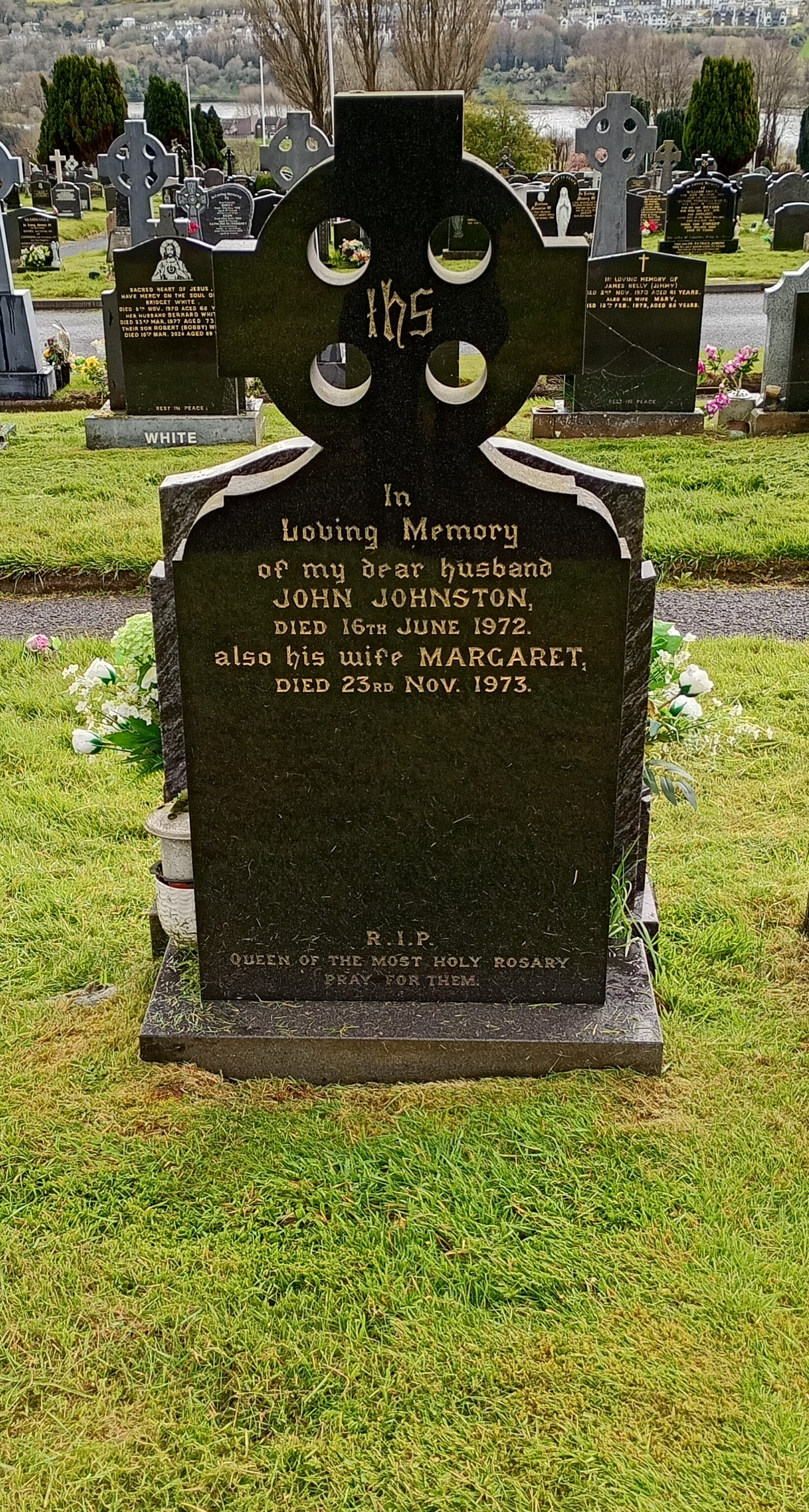
Graves of Bloody Sunday victims in Derry City Cemetery

The British Army's version of events, outlined by the Ministry of Defence and repeated by Home Secretary Reginald Maudling in the House of Commons the day after Bloody Sunday, was that paratroopers returned fire at gunmen and bomb-throwers. Bernadette Devlin, the independent Irish socialist republican Member of Parliament (MP) for Mid Ulster, slapped Maudling for his comments, and was temporarily suspended from parliament. Having been "an eye-witness to the events of the previous day", Devlin was infuriated that the Speaker of the House of Commons, Selwyn Lloyd, repeatedly denied her the opportunity to speak about it in parliament, although a number of MPs argued that it was critical her evidence be heard.

On Wednesday 2 February 1972, tens of thousands attended the funerals of 11 of the victims. In the Republic of Ireland, it was observed as a national day of mourning; there was also a general strike – the biggest in Europe since the Second World War relative to population. Memorial services were held in Catholic and Protestant churches, as well as synagogues, throughout the Republic, while schools closed and public transport stopped running. Large crowds had besieged the chancery of the British embassy on Merrion Square in Dublin, and embassy staff had been evacuated. That Wednesday, tens of thousands of protesters marched to the chancery, with 13 coffins being placed symbolically outside the entrance. The Union Jack was burnt and the building attacked with stones and petrol bombs. Outnumbered Gardaí tried to push back the crowd, but the building was burnt down.

Anglo-Irish relations reached one of their lowest points, with the Irish Minister for Foreign Affairs, Patrick Hillery, going to the United Nations Security Council to demand the involvement of a UN peacekeeping force in the Northern Ireland conflict. Kieran Conway, the head of the IRA's intelligence-gathering department for a period in the 1970s, stated in his memoir that after the massacre, the IRA Southern Command in Dublin received up to 200 applications from Southern Irish citizens to fight the British.

Harold Wilson, then the Leader of the Opposition in the House of Commons, reiterated his belief that a united Ireland was the only possible solution to Northern Ireland's Troubles. William Craig, then Stormont Home Affairs Minister, suggested that the west bank of Derry should be ceded to the Republic of Ireland.

On 22 February 1972, the Official IRA attempted to retaliate for Bloody Sunday by detonating a car bomb at Aldershot military barracks, headquarters of 16th Parachute Brigade, killing seven ancillary staff.

An inquest into the deaths was held in August 1973. The city's coroner, Hubert O'Neill, a retired British Army major, issued a statement at the completion of the inquest. He declared:

This Sunday became known as Bloody Sunday and bloody it was. It was quite unnecessary. It strikes me that the Army ran amok that day and shot without thinking what they were doing. They were shooting innocent people. These people may have been taking part in a march that was banned but that does not justify the troops coming in and firing live rounds indiscriminately. I would say without hesitation that it was sheer, unadulterated murder. It was murder.

=== Shankill shootings ===
Several months after Bloody Sunday, 1 Para – again under Lt Col Wilford's command – were involved in another controversial shooting incident. On 7 September, paratroopers raided the headquarters of the Ulster Defence Association (UDA) and houses in the Shankill area of Belfast. The paratroopers fired both rubber and live rounds. It was claimed that they used small-calibre, private owned weapons to avoid accountability by their superiors.

Two Protestant civilians were shot dead, and others wounded, by the paratroopers, who claimed they were returning fire at loyalist gunmen. This sparked angry demonstrations by local Protestants, with the UDA declaring: "Never has Ulster witnessed such licensed sadists and such blatant liars as the 1st Paras. These gun-happy louts must be removed from the streets". A unit of the British Army's Ulster Defence Regiment refused to carry out duties until 1 Para was withdrawn from the Shankill.

At the end of 1972, Wilford – who was directly in charge of the soldiers involved in Bloody Sunday and in the Shankill incident – was appointed an Officer of the Order of the British Empire (OBE).

== Widgery Tribunal inquiry ==
Two days after Bloody Sunday, the British Parliament adopted a resolution for a tribunal into the shootings, resulting in Prime Minister Edward Heath commissioning the Lord Chief Justice, Lord Widgery, to undertake it. Many witnesses intended to boycott the tribunal, as they lacked faith in Widgery's impartiality, but many were eventually persuaded to take part.

Widgery's quickly produced report – completed within 10 weeks (on 10 April) and published within 11 weeks (on 19 April) – supported the British Army's account of the events of the day. It stated that the soldiers returned fire at gunmen and bomb-throwers. It said: "None of the deceased or wounded is proved to have been shot whilst handling a firearm or bomb. Some are wholly acquitted of complicity in such action; but there is a strong suspicion that some others had been firing weapons or handling bombs".

Among the evidence presented to the tribunal were the results of paraffin tests, used to identify lead residues from firing weapons, and that nail bombs had been found on the body of one of those killed. Tests for traces of explosives on the clothes of 11 of the dead proved negative, while those of the remaining man could not be tested, as they had already been washed. It has been argued that firearms residue on some victims may have come from contact with the soldiers who moved some of the bodies, or that lead residue on the hands of one (James Wray) was easily explained by the fact that his occupation involved using lead-based solder. (Note: The contamination discovered upon victim William Nash was solely discovered upon his right hand, whereas Nash was left-handed. He was one of the fatalities at the barricade and was later placed by paratroopers into an Army APC.) Widgery held the march organisers responsible: "There would have been no deaths [...] if those who organised the illegal march had not thereby created a highly dangerous situation".

Widgery stated there was no evidence the paratroopers were sent to "flush out any IRA gunmen in the Bogside" or to punish its residents for opposing the British Army. The Saville Inquiry also examined classified documents and found no evidence of such a plan, but added: "It is of course possible for plans to be hatched in secret and kept out of documents".

Most witnesses to the event disputed the report's conclusions and regarded it as a whitewash. The slogan, "Widgery washes whiter" – a play on the contemporary advertisement for Daz soap powder – was emblazoned on walls in Derry, crystallising the views of many nationalists about the report.

In 1992, British Prime Minister John Major, replying to John Hume's request for a new public inquiry, stated: "The Government made clear in 1974 that those who were killed on 'Bloody Sunday' should be regarded as innocent of any allegation that they were shot whilst handling firearms or explosives". Major was succeeded by Tony Blair. Blair's chief aide, Jonathan Powell, later described Widgery as a "complete and utter whitewash".

== Saville Inquiry ==
The Derry Guildhall, home to the Inquiry

In 1998, during the latter stages of the Northern Ireland peace process, Prime Minister Blair agreed to hold a public inquiry into Bloody Sunday. The inquiry, chaired by Lord Saville, was established in April 1998. The other judges were John Toohey, a former Justice of the High Court of Australia who had worked on Aboriginal issues (he replaced New Zealander Sir Edward Somers, who retired from the Inquiry in 2000 for personal reasons), and William Hoyt, former Chief Justice of New Brunswick and member of the Canadian Judicial Council. The inquiry heard testimony at the Guildhall in Derry from March 2000 until November 2004.

The Saville Inquiry was much more comprehensive than the Widgery Tribunal, interviewing a wide range of witnesses. These included local residents, soldiers, journalists and politicians. The inquiry also reviewed a large volume of photographs and footage. Lord Saville declined to comment on the Widgery report: he emphasised that this was a judicial inquiry into Bloody Sunday, not a review of the Widgery Tribunal.

Colonel Wilford expressed anger at the decision to hold the inquiry and said he was proud of his actions on Bloody Sunday. Two years later, in 2000, Wilford said: "There might have been things wrong in the sense that some innocent people, people who were not carrying a weapon, were wounded or even killed. But that was not done as a deliberate malicious act. It was done as an act of war." In 2007, General (then Captain) Sir Mike Jackson, adjutant of 1 Para on Bloody Sunday, said: "I have no doubt that innocent people were shot." This was in contrast to his insistence, for more than 30 years, that those killed had not been innocent.

One former paratrooper testified that a lieutenant told them the night before Bloody Sunday: "Let's teach these buggers a lesson – we want some kills tomorrow". He said he did not see anyone with a weapon, nor hear any explosions, and claimed that some fellow soldiers were thrilled and shooting out of bravado or frustration. The paratrooper said several soldiers "fired their own personal supply of dum-dums", which were banned, and that one "fired 10 dum-dums into the crowd but as he still had his official quota he got away with saying he never fired a shot". The paratrooper said his original statement to the Widgery Inquiry was torn up and replaced by one "bearing no relation with fact".

Many observers allege that the Ministry of Defence (MoD) acted in a way that impeded the inquiry. Over 1,000 Army photographs and original Army helicopter video footage were never made available. Guns used by the soldiers on Bloody Sunday, which could have been evidence in the inquiry, were lost by the MoD. The MoD claimed all the guns had been destroyed, but some were later recovered in various locations (such as Sierra Leone and Beirut), despite the obstruction.

By the time the inquiry had retired to write up its findings, it had interviewed over 900 witnesses over seven years, making it the biggest investigation in British legal history. It was also the longest and most expensive, taking 12 years and costing £195 million. The inquiry was expected to report in late 2009, but was delayed until after the 2010 general election. Saville said he had "no regrets" over the time taken for and cost of the inquiry, if it was to achieve what it had set out to do.

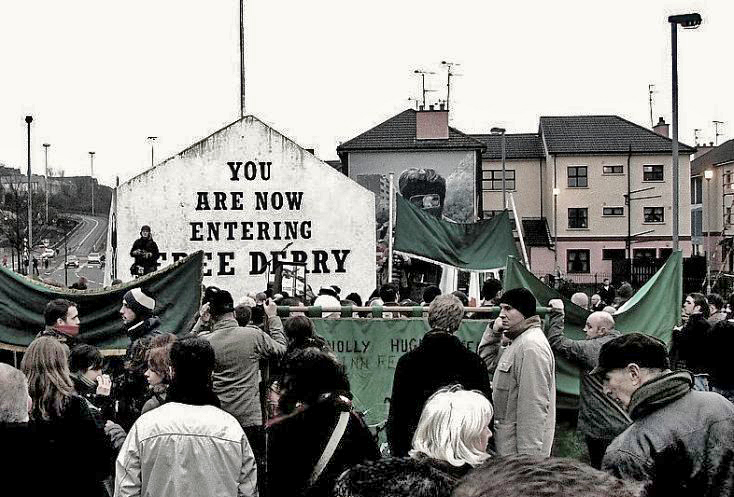
The 35th Bloody Sunday memorial march in Derry, 28 January 2007

=== Report ===
The report of the inquiry was published on 15 June 2010. It concluded: "The firing by soldiers of 1 PARA on Bloody Sunday caused the deaths of 13 people and injury to a similar number, none of whom was posing a threat of causing death or serious injury." It stated that British paratroopers "lost control", shooting fleeing civilians and those who tried to help the wounded. The civilians had not been warned by soldiers that they intended to shoot.

Contrary to the soldiers' claims, the report concluded that the victims were unarmed and that no nail bombs or petrol bombs were thrown. "None of them fired in response to attacks or threatened attacks by nail or petrol bombers." It stated that while some soldiers probably fired out of fear and recklessness, others did not, but fired at civilians they knew were unarmed. The report stated that soldiers lied to hide their acts.

The inquiry concluded that an Official IRA sniper, positioned in a block of flats, fired one round at British soldiers who were at the Presbyterian church on the other side of William Street. The bullet missed the soldiers and hit a drainpipe. The inquiry concluded that it was fired shortly after the British soldiers had shot Damien Donaghy and John Johnston in this area. It rejected the sniper's account that he fired in reprisal, concluding that he and another Official IRA member had already been in position and probably fired simply because the opportunity presented itself. The inquiry also concluded that an Official IRA member fired a handgun at a British APC from behind a gable wall near Rossville Flats, but there is no evidence the soldiers noticed this. The IRA member said he fired three rounds in anger after seeing civilians shot. He was seen by Father Edward Daly and others, who shouted at him to stop.

Martin McGuinness, a senior member of Sinn Féin and later deputy First Minister of Northern Ireland, stated in his testimony that he was second-in-command of the Provisional IRA Derry Brigade and was at the march. Paddy Ward told the inquiry he was the local leader of Fianna Éireann, the IRA youth wing, in January 1972. He claimed that McGuinness and another unnamed IRA member gave him bomb detonators on the morning of Bloody Sunday, with the intent to attack premises in Derry city centre that day.

McGuinness rejected the claims as "fantasy", while Gerry O'Hara, a Sinn Féin councillor in Derry, stated that he, not Ward, was the Fianna leader at the time. The inquiry was unsure of McGuinness's movements on the day. It stated that while he had probably been armed with a Thompson submachine gun, there was insufficient evidence to state whether he fired it, but concluded: "we are sure that he did not engage in any activity that provided any of the soldiers with any justification for opening fire".

Findings regarding officers:

- Major General Robert Ford: Commander of land forces in Northern Ireland and responsible for setting the British strategy to oversee the march in Derry. Cleared of any fault, but his choice of 1 Para – and, in particular, his selection of Wilford to be in control of arresting rioters – was found to be disconcerting, as "1 PARA was a force with a reputation for using excessive physical violence, which thus ran the risk of exacerbating the tensions between the Army and nationalists".
- Brigadier Pat MacLellan: Overall operational commander on the day. Cleared of any wrongdoing as he believed Wilford would follow orders by arresting rioters and then returning to base; could not be blamed for Wilford's actions.
- Lieutenant Colonel Derek Wilford: Commander of 1 Para, directly responsible for the arrest operation. Found to have "deliberately disobeyed" his superior, Brigadier Patrick MacLellan, by sending Support Company into the Bogside (and without informing MacLellan).
- Major Ted Loden: Commander in charge of Support Company, following orders from Lieutenant Colonel Wilford. Cleared of misconduct; the report stated that Loden "neither realised nor should have realised that his soldiers were or might be firing at people who were not posing [...] a threat". The inquiry found that Loden could not be held responsible for claims (whether malicious or not) by some of the soldiers that they had received fire from snipers.
- Major Michael Steele: Present with MacLellan in the operations room and responsible for passing on orders. The inquiry accepted that Steele did not know there was no longer a separation between rioters and peaceful marchers.
- Captain Mike Jackson: Adjutant of 1 Para on Bloody Sunday. Cleared of sinister actions for compiling the "Loden List of Engagements". This was a brief account of what soldiers told Major Loden about why they had fired. The list played a role in the Army's initial explanations. It did not include soldiers' names. Jackson told the inquiry it was simply a record of shots fired, not an investigative document. While the inquiry found the compiling of the list was "far from ideal", it accepted Jackson's explanations.
- Colonel Maurice Tugwell and Captain Colin Wallace: Intelligence officer and Army press officer, respectively. Cleared of wrongdoing. The inquiry concluded that the incorrect information Tugwell, in particular, and Wallace released – much of which appeared in the British media the following morning – was not a deliberate attempt to deceive the public; rather, it was due to inaccurate information having been received from the Parachute Regiment.

Reporting on the findings of the Saville Inquiry in the House of Commons, British Prime Minister David Cameron said:

Mr Speaker, I am deeply patriotic. I never want to believe anything bad about our country. I never want to call into question the behaviour of our soldiers and our army, who I believe to be the finest in the world. And I have seen for myself the very difficult and dangerous circumstances in which we ask our soldiers to serve. But the conclusions of this report are absolutely clear. There is no doubt, there is nothing equivocal, there are no ambiguities. What happened on Bloody Sunday was both unjustified and unjustifiable. It was wrong.

Cameron added: "You do not defend the British Army by defending the indefensible." He acknowledged that all those who died were unarmed when they were killed and that a British soldier had fired the first shots at civilians. He also said that this was not premeditated, though "there was no point in trying to soften or equivocate", as "what happened should never, ever have happened". Cameron apologised on behalf of the British Government, saying he was "deeply sorry". A survey by Angus Reid Public Opinion in June 2010 found that 61 per cent of Britons, and 70 per cent of Northern Irish people, agreed with Cameron's apology. Stephen Pollard, a solicitor representing several of the soldiers, said the report had cherry-picked the evidence and did not have justification for its findings.

== Murder charges ==
Following the publication of the Saville Report, a murder investigation was begun by the Police Service of Northern Ireland's Legacy Investigation Branch. On 10 November 2015, a 66-year-old former member of the Parachute Regiment, referred to as "Soldier J" in the Saville Report, was arrested for questioning over the deaths of William Nash, Michael McDaid and John Young. He was released on bail shortly after. On 8 March 2016, a former 1 Para lance corporal referred to as "Soldier F" was questioned by police regarding his actions on the day in question. The Saville Inquiry found him responsible for up to five of the killings. He had previously admitted firing a total of 13 bullets on the day, asserting that he had operated within the British Army's "Yellow Card" rules of engagement at all times. "Soldier F" asserted during the interview that he had no reliable recollections of what happened and was, therefore, refusing to answer any questions put to him; however, he added that he was sure he had properly discharged his duties as a soldier on that day.

The Public Prosecution Service for Northern Ireland announced in March 2019 that there was enough evidence to prosecute "Soldier F" for the murders of James Wray and William McKinney, both of whom were shot in the back. He was also charged with four attempted murders. The Saville Inquiry concluded that "Soldier F" also killed Michael Kelly, Patrick Doherty and Barney McGuigan. As evidence from the inquiry was inadmissible to the prosecution, 'the only evidence capable of identifying the soldier who fired the relevant shots came from "Soldier F"'s co-accused, "Soldier G", who is deceased'.

Relatives of the Bloody Sunday victims expressed dismay that only one soldier would face trial for some of the killings. In September 2020, it was ruled that there would be no charges against any other soldiers. The victims' relatives were supported by Irish nationalist political representatives. "Soldier F" received support from some Ulster loyalists and from the group Justice for Northern Ireland Veterans. The Democratic Unionist Party (DUP) called for former British soldiers to be given immunity from prosecution. Ulster Unionist Party (UUP) leader, and former soldier, Doug Beattie, said that if soldiers "went outside the law, then they have to face the law".

In July 2021, the Public Prosecution Service decided it would no longer prosecute "Soldier F" because statements from 1972 were deemed inadmissible as evidence. As a result, on 3 July, the full name of "Soldier F" was posted on legal notices hung in Derry's Guildhall Square, which individuals shared on social media. The same day, Village magazine published his full name and photographs of him at the time of the massacre. Posters with "Soldier F"'s identity were placed at Free Derry Corner and throughout Derry, which police have repeatedly seized. On 13 July 2021, Social Democratic and Labour Party MP Colum Eastwood revealed the name of "Soldier F" using parliamentary privilege. Aontú TD Peadar Tóibín also named "Soldier F" in the Dáil Éireann on 9 February 2022 and Sinn Féin TD Patricia Ryan on 24 May 2022. Twitter bans British and Irish users who post "Soldier F"'s name.

In March 2022, the High Court overturned the decision not to press charges against "Soldier F", following an appeal by the family of William McKinney, and ordered the Public Prosecution Service to reconsider the case. The PPS attempted to appeal the court's decision to the Supreme Court of the United Kingdom, but permission to appeal was refused that September and the PPS was forced to continue with the prosecution. In October 2022, it was announced that the committal hearing against "Soldier F" would resume on 16 January 2023. On 24 January 2023 , the case against "Soldier F" was resumed at Derry Magistrate's Court. Following an adjournment, the case resumed on 26 May 2023. On 25 August 2023, Judge Ted Magill ruled that five statements given to the Widgery Report implicating "Soldier F" could be used as evidence at trial.

In December 2023, an evidentiary hearing was held to decide whether or not to proceed to trial. Judge Magill ruled that "Soldier F" should face trial at Belfast Crown Court. The soldier appeared in court for the first time on 14 June 2024. In December 2024, "Soldier F" pleaded not guilty to two charges of murder and five of attempted murder, after Judge Fowler overruled attempts by the soldier's lawyers to have the case dismissed. The trial was scheduled to begin in mid-September 2025.

=== Soldier F murder trial ===
On 15 September 2025, at Belfast Crown Court, the former British paratrooper known as "Soldier F" went on trial for the murder of William McKinney and James Wray, as well as five counts of attempted murder (regarding Patrick O'Donnell, Joseph Friel, Joe Mahon, Michael Quinn and an unknown person) on Bloody Sunday. The defendant, who was screened from public view by a black curtain, pleaded not guilty to all charges before Judge Patrick Lynch at the non‑jury court.

On 23 October, Lynch ruled that "Soldier F" was not guilty and acquitted him of all charges, stating that "evidence presented by the Crown falls way short of standard" to prove guilt beyond reasonable doubt. He highlighted how statements from "Soldier H" and "Soldier G" could not be relied upon as they had both committed perjury at previous legal inquiries, and they potentially had ulterior motives to name "Soldier F" as a participant in their own murderous activities on the day in question.

In a response to a parliamentary question from Colum Eastwood, it was revealed that the UK government had spent over £4 million on the legal defence of "Soldier F", much of which related to legal fees but also included the costs of flights and accommodation for the former paratrooper.

== Impact on Northern Ireland divisions ==
When it was first deployed on duty in Northern Ireland during the 1969 Northern Ireland riots, the British Army was welcomed by many Catholics as a neutral force there to protect them from Protestant loyalist mobs, the RUC and the B-Specials. After Bloody Sunday, many Catholics turned on the British Army, seeing it no longer as their protector but as their enemy. Young nationalists became increasingly attracted to armed republican groups. With the Official IRA and Official Sinn Féin having moved away from mainstream Irish republicanism towards Marxism, the Provisional IRA began to win the support of newly radicalised, disaffected youth.

In the following 20 years, the Provisional IRA, and other smaller republican groups such as the Irish National Liberation Army, stepped up their armed campaigns against the state and those seen as being in service to it. With rival paramilitary organisations appearing in both the republican and loyalist communities (such as the UDA, Ulster Volunteer Force (UVF), etc. on the loyalist side), the Troubles cost the lives of thousands of people.

In 1979, the Provisional IRA killed 18 British soldiers in the Warrenpoint ambush, most of them paratroopers. This happened the same day the IRA assassinated Lord Mountbatten. Republicans portrayed the attack as belated retaliation for Bloody Sunday, with graffiti declaring: "13 gone and not forgotten, we got 18 and Mountbatten".

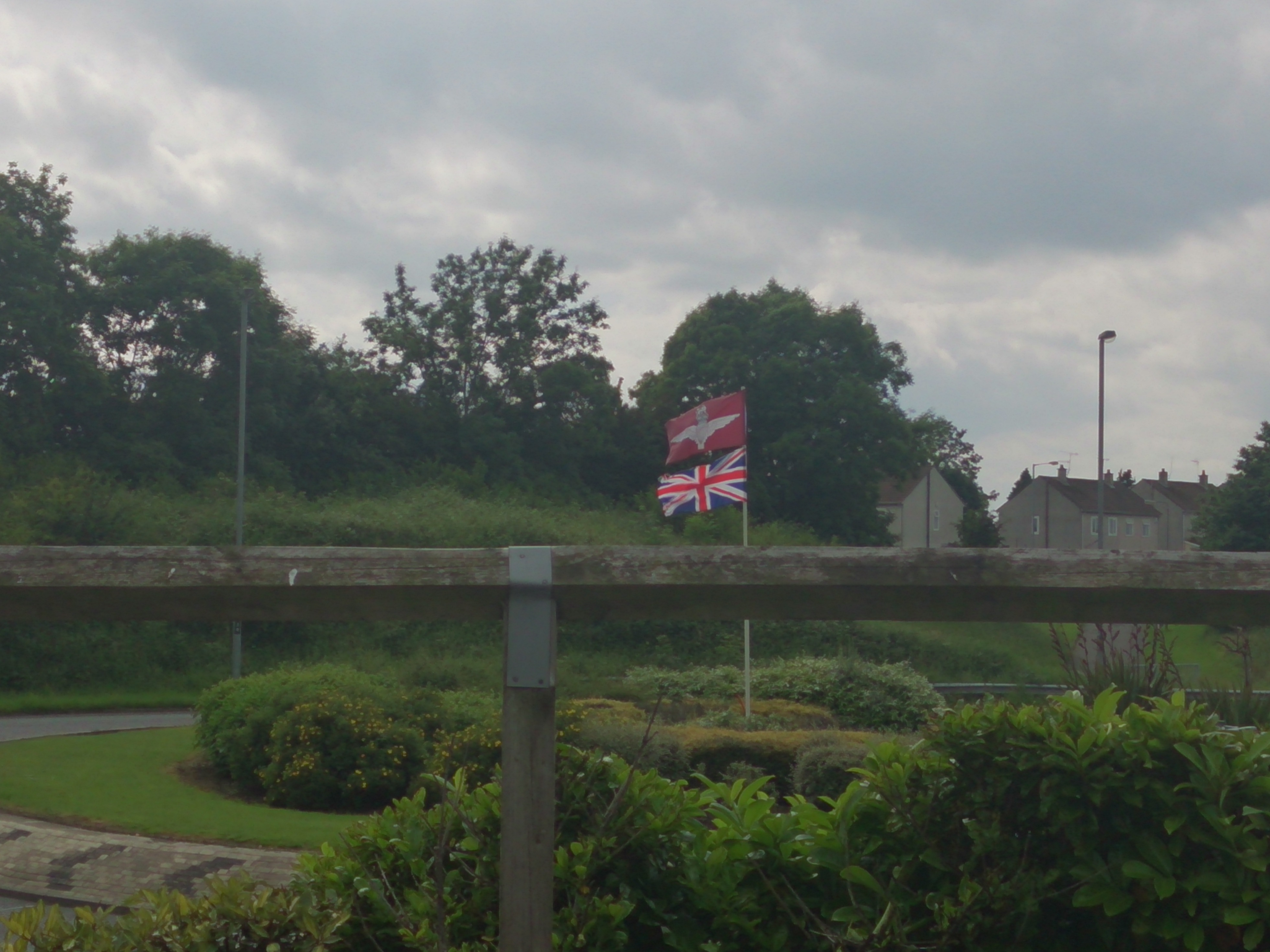
Parachute Regiment flag and the Union flag flying in Ballymena

In 2012, a serving British soldier from Belfast was charged with inciting hatred, due to their use of online social media to post sectarian slurs about the killings, along with banners of the Parachute Regiment.

In recent years, Parachute Regiment flags have been erected by some loyalists around the time of the Bloody Sunday anniversaries. In January 2013, shortly before the yearly Bloody Sunday remembrance march, several Parachute Regiment flags were flown in loyalist areas of Derry. The flying of the flags was condemned by nationalist politicians and by relatives of the Bloody Sunday dead. The MoD also condemned the flying of the flags. The flags were replaced by Union Jacks. Later that year, the Parachute Regiment flag was flown alongside other loyalist flags in other parts of Northern Ireland. In 2014, loyalists erected the flags near the route of a Saint Patrick's Day parade in Cookstown.

== Artistic reaction ==
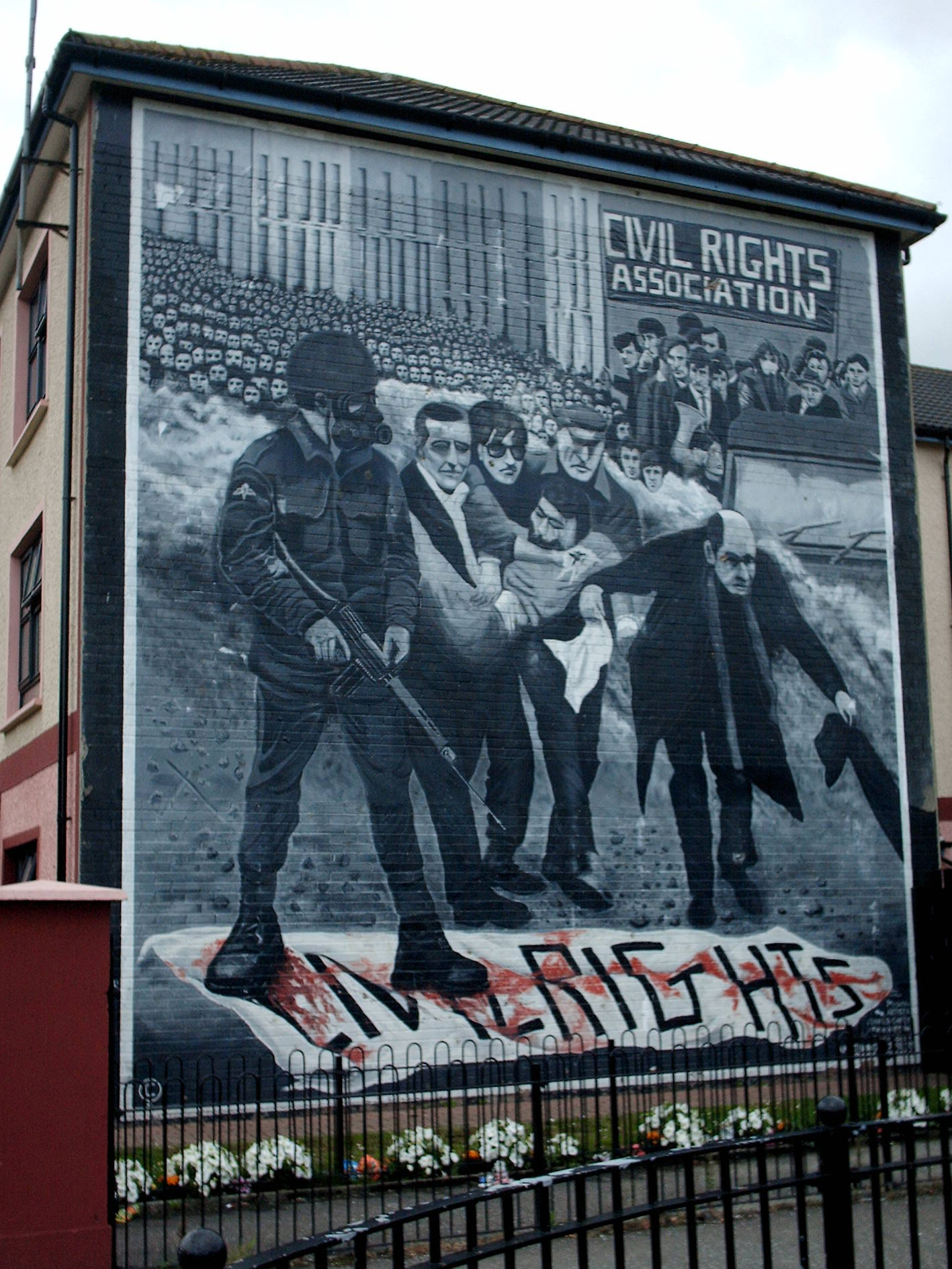
A mural in Derry commemorating Bloody Sunday

Paul McCartney and Wings recorded the first song in response only two days after the massacre. The single, "Give Ireland Back to the Irish", was banned by the BBC for its political content.

In March 1972, Irish traditional group Paddywagon released "Sunday Bloody Sunday", responding to the incident; it reached number one in the Republic of Ireland.

The 1972 John Lennon album Some Time in New York City features a song titled "Sunday Bloody Sunday", inspired by the incident, as well as the song "The Luck of the Irish", which dealt more with the Irish conflict in general. Lennon, who was of Irish descent, also spoke at a protest in New York in support of the victims and families of Bloody Sunday.

Irish poet Thomas Kinsella's 1972 poem Butcher's Dozen is a satirical and angry response to the Widgery Tribunal and the events of Bloody Sunday.

Black Sabbath's Geezer Butler (also of Irish descent) wrote the lyrics to the Black Sabbath song "Sabbath Bloody Sabbath" on the album of the same name in 1973. Butler stated: "…the Sunday Bloody Sunday thing had just happened in Ireland, when the British troops opened fire on the Irish demonstrators… So I came up with the title 'Sabbath Bloody Sabbath', and sort of put it in how the band was feeling at the time, getting away from management, mixed with the state Ireland was in."

The Roy Harper song "All Ireland", from the album Lifemask, written in the days following the incident, is critical of the military but takes a long-term view with regard to a solution. In Harper's book (The Passions of Great Fortune), his comment on the song ends "…there must always be some hope that the children of 'Bloody Sunday', on both sides, can grow into some wisdom".

Brian Friel's 1973 play The Freedom of the City deals with the incident from the viewpoint of three civilians.

Irish poet Seamus Heaney's Casualty (published in Field Work, 1981) criticises Britain for the death of his friend.

The Irish rock band U2 commemorated the incident in their 1983 protest song "Sunday Bloody Sunday".

Christy Moore's song "Minds Locked Shut", on the 1996 album Graffiti Tongue is about the events of the day and names the dead civilians.

The events of the day have been dramatised in two 2002 television films: Bloody Sunday (starring James Nesbitt) and Sunday by Jimmy McGovern.

The Celtic metal band Cruachan addressed the incident in a song "Bloody Sunday" from their 2002 album Folk-Lore.

Willie Doherty, a Derry-born artist, has amassed a large body of work addressing the Troubles in Northern Ireland. 30 January 1972 deals specifically with the events of Bloody Sunday.

In mid-2005, the play Bloody Sunday: Scenes from the Saville Inquiry, a dramatisation based on the Saville Inquiry, opened in London and subsequently travelled to Derry and Dublin. The writer, journalist Richard Norton-Taylor, distilled four years of evidence into two hours of stage performance at the Tricycle Theatre. The play received glowing reviews in all the British broadsheets, including The Times: "The Tricycle's latest recreation of a major inquiry is its most devastating"; The Daily Telegraph: "I can't praise this enthralling production too highly… exceptionally gripping courtroom drama"; and The Independent: "A necessary triumph".

In October 2010, T with the Maggies released the song "Domhnach na Fola" (Irish for "Bloody Sunday"), written by Mairéad Ní Mhaonaigh, Moya Brennan, Tríona Ní Dhomhnaill and Maighread Ní Dhomhnaill on their T with the Maggies album.

== Bibliography ==
- Tony Geraghty (2000). The Irish War. Johns Hopkins University Press. ISBN 0-8018-7117-4.
- Raymond McClean (1997). The Road To Bloody Sunday (revised ed.). Guildhall: Printing Press. ISBN 0-946451-37-0. (extracts available online)
- Eamonn McCann (1998). Bloody Sunday in Derry. What Really Happened. Brandon: Printing Press. ISBN 0-86322-139-4.
- Dermot P.J. Walsh (2000). Bloody Sunday and the rule of law in Northern Ireland. Gill & Macmillan. ISBN 0-7171-3085-1.
- Jennifer Faus (2007). Before Sunday. Nonsuch Publishing. ISBN 978-1-84588-573-1.
- English, Richard (2003). Armed Struggle: A History of the IRA. London: MacMillan. ISBN 1-4050-0108-9.
