= Pat MacLellan =

British Army general (1925–2024

Major General Andrew Patrick Withy MacLellan CB, CVO, MBE (29 November 1925 – 19 April 2024), usually known as Pat MacLellan, was a senior British Army officer. While a brigadier, he was in charge of Operation Forecast, the British Army arrest operation in Derry on Bloody Sunday (30 January 1972) during which 13 civilians were shot dead by the Parachute Regiment.

== Life and career ==
Born in Dunbartonshire, Scotland, and educated at Uppingham School, MacLellan was always addressed as "Pat". He was commissioned into the Coldstream Guards in 1944, served in Palestine and was later assistant to Lord Mountbatten. He became a major general in 1977 before leaving the Army in 1980. He was Governor and Keeper of the Jewel House, Tower of London, between 1984 and 1989. MacLellan was awarded the MBE in 1964.

== Widgery Tribunal ==
MacLellan was questioned extensively at the Widgery Tribunal of early 1972 that inquired into the events of Bloody Sunday; later he felt that Lord Widgery had "put the responsibility for the whole thing on my shoulders". Widgery concluded that while MacLellan had attempted to ensure as much of a gap as possible had developed between peaceful marchers and rioters, this separation had never really taken place: "Whether the Brigade Commander was guilty of an error of judgment in giving orders for the arrest operation to proceed is a question which others can judge as well or better than I can. It was a decision made in good faith by an experienced officer on the information available to him, but he underestimated the dangers involved".

== Bloody Sunday Inquiry ==
In 2002 MacLellan admitted to the Saville Inquiry into Bloody Sunday that he may have erred in sending the Parachute Regiment into the Bogside at the wrong moment for the limited arrest operation he had in mind and that he was unaware of the specific details of how the operation was to be carried out. The inquiry subsequently found that no blame could be attached to MacLellan for a subordinate officer, 1 Para commander Lieutenant Colonel Wilford, disobeying his orders.
