= Ballymurphy massacre =

Massacre in Belfast by the British Army

- Part of the Troubles
- Location: 54°34′30″N 5°58′26″W; Belfast, Northern Ireland
- Date: 9–11 August 1971
- Attack type: Mass shooting
- Deaths: 11 civilians
- Perpetrators: The Parachute Regiment, British Army

The Ballymurphy massacre was a series of incidents between 9 and 11 August 1971, in which the 1st Battalion, Parachute Regiment of the British Army killed eleven civilians in Ballymurphy, Belfast, Northern Ireland, as part of Operation Demetrius (internment without trial). The shootings were later referred to as Belfast's Bloody Sunday, a reference to the killing of civilians by the same battalion in Derry a few months later, in which the name was first applied. The 1972 inquests returned an open verdict on all of the killings, but a 2021 coroner's report found that all those killed had been innocent and that the killings were "without justification".

== Background ==
Belfast was particularly affected by political and sectarian violence during the early part of the Troubles. The British Army had been deployed in Northern Ireland in 1969, as events had become beyond the control of the Royal Ulster Constabulary.

On the morning of Monday 9 August 1971, the security forces launched Operation Demetrius, the main focus of which was to arrest and intern suspected members of the Provisional Irish Republican Army (IRA). The Parachute Regiment was selected to carry out the operation. The operation was chaotic and informed by poor intelligence, resulting in many innocent people being interned. By focusing solely on republicans, it excluded violence carried out by loyalist paramilitaries. Some nationalist neighbourhoods attempted to disrupt the army with barricades, petrol bombs and gunfire. In the Catholic district of Ballymurphy, 10 civilians were shot and killed between the evening of 9 August and the morning of 11 August, while another died of heart failure.

Members of the Parachute Regiment stated that they were shot at by republicans as they entered the Ballymurphy area and returned fire. The press officer for the British Army stationed in Belfast, Mike Jackson, later to become head of the British Army, includes a disputed account of the shootings in his autobiography, stating that those killed in the shootings were republican gunmen. This claim was strongly denied by the families of those killed, including in interviews conducted during the documentary film The Ballymurphy Precedent. The claim was found to be without basis by a later coroner's inquest, which established that those killed were "entirely innocent".

== Timeline ==
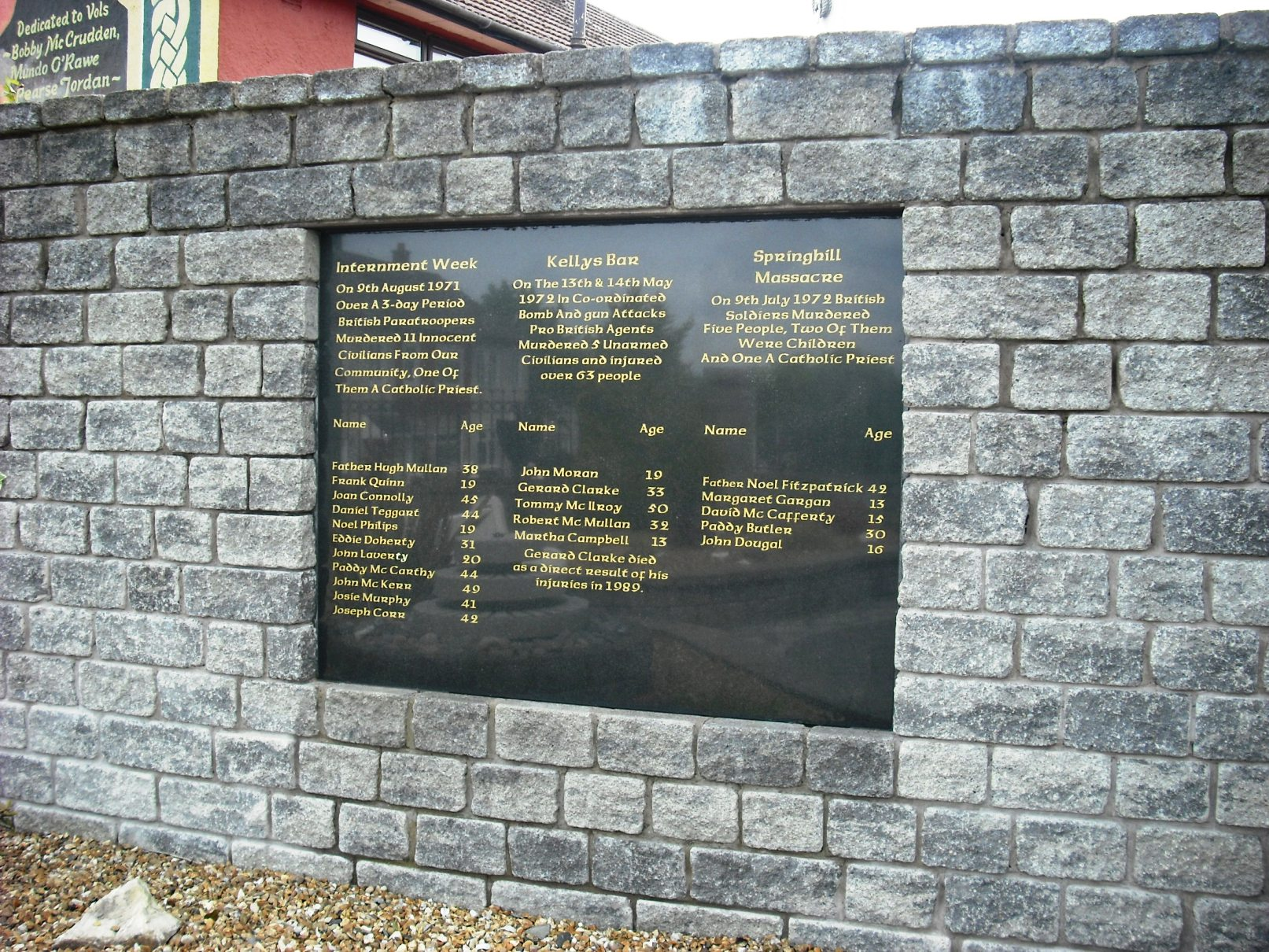
Commemoration plaque in a remembrance garden in Ballymurphy, Belfast

Six civilians were killed on 9 August:

- Francis Quinn (19), shot while going to the aid of a wounded man.
- Father Hugh Mullan (38), a Catholic priest, shot while going to the aid of a wounded man, reputedly while waving a white cloth to indicate his intentions.
- Joan Connolly (44), shot as she stood opposite the army base. It has been claimed she was shot by three soldiers and that she might have survived had she been given medical attention sooner, but she lay injured in a field for several hours.
- Daniel Teggart (44) shot 14 times. Most of the bullets entered his back, allegedly as he lay injured on the ground.
- Noel Phillips (20), shot as he stood opposite the army base.
- Joseph Murphy (41), shot as he stood opposite the army base. Murphy was subsequently taken into army custody and, after his release, as he was dying in hospital, he claimed that he had been beaten and shot again while in custody. When his body was exhumed in October 2015, a second bullet was discovered, which activists said corroborated his claim.

One civilian was killed on 10 August:

- Edward Doherty (28), shot while walking along Whiterock Road.

Another three civilians were shot on 11 August:

- John Laverty (20) and Joseph Corr (43) shot at separate points at the top of Whiterock Road. Laverty was shot twice, once in the back and once in the back of the leg. Corr was shot several times and died of his injuries on 27 August.
- John McKerr (49), shot in the head by an unknown sniper while standing outside a Catholic church, and died of his injuries on 20 August. While eyewitnesses stated that soldiers were seen shooting towards the area, the 2021 inquest could not establish who had killed him. The coroner noted that a more specific finding was not possible due to an "abject failing by the authorities to properly inquire into the death of [McKerr at the time]".

An 11th civilian died on 11 August, following an altercation with a group of soldiers:

- Patrick "Paddy" McCarthy (44), McCarthy's family allege that an empty gun was put in his mouth and the trigger pulled; he suffered a heart attack and died shortly after the alleged confrontation.

== Inquests ==
In February 2015, the conviction of Terry Laverty, younger brother of John Laverty, was quashed by the Criminal Cases Review Commission. He had been convicted of riotous behaviour and sentenced to six months on the eyewitness evidence of a private in the Parachute Regiment. The case was referred to court because the sole witness retracted his evidence.

In 2016, Sir Declan Morgan, the Lord Chief Justice of Northern Ireland, recommended an inquest into the killings as one of a series of "legacy inquests" covering 56 cases related to the Troubles. These inquests were delayed, as funding had not been approved by the Northern Ireland Executive. The Stormont first minister, Arlene Foster of the Democratic Unionist Party, deferred a bid for extra funding for inquests into historic killings in Northern Ireland, a decision condemned by Amnesty International. Foster confirmed she had used her influence in the devolved power-sharing executive to hold back finance for a backlog of inquests connected to the conflict. The High Court said her decision to refuse to put a funding paper on the Executive basis was "unlawful and procedurally flawed".

In January 2018, the coroner's office announced that the inquest would begin in September 2018. On 11 May 2021, this coroner's inquest found that the 10 civilians killed were innocent, and that the use of lethal force by the British Army was "not justified". The circumstances of the 11th were not part of the inquest, since Paddy McCarthy died from a heart attack, allegedly after being threatened by a soldier. Following the verdict, Boris Johnson, the British prime minister, apologised for the deaths at Ballymurphy in a phone call to Foster and deputy first minister Michelle O'Neill. The lack of public apology was criticised by some relatives of the victims and Northern Irish politicians.

In May 2021, families of those shot dead in Ballymurphy urged the Irish government to oppose any attempt to prevent the prosecution of British soldiers alleged to have committed crimes during the Troubles.

== Documentary ==
The killings are the subject of the August 2018 documentary The Ballymurphy Precedent, directed by Callum Macrae and made in association with Channel 4.

== See also ==
- List of massacres in Ireland
