= Mark Saville, Baron Saville of Newdigate =

English judge (born 1936)

The Right Honourable The Lord Saville of Newdigate PC
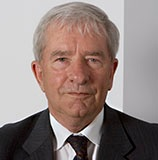

Member of the House of Lords
- Lord Temporal
- Lord of Appeal in Ordinary; 28 July 1997 – 20 June 2024

Justice of the Supreme Court of the United Kingdom (Note: Lord of Appeal in Ordinary until 30 September 2009)
- In office 28 July 1997 – 30 September 2010
- Nominated by: Jack Straw
- Appointed by: Elizabeth II
- Preceded by: The Lord Mustill
- Succeeded by: Lord Wilson of Culworth

Lord Justice of Appeal
- In office 1994–1997

High Court Judge
- In office 1985–1993

Personal details
- Born: Mark Oliver Saville; 20 March 1936 (age 90)
- Spouse: Jill Gray (m. 1961)
- Education: Brasenose College, Oxford
- Occupation: Judge
- Profession: Barrister

Military service
- Branch: British Army
- Service years: 1954–1956
- Rank: Second lieutenant
- Unit: Royal Sussex Regiment

Mark Oliver Saville, Baron Saville of Newdigate (born 20 March 1936), is an English judge and former Justice of the Supreme Court of the United Kingdom.

== Early life ==
Saville was born on 20 March 1936 to Kenneth Vivian Saville and Olivia Sarah Frances Gray, and educated at Rye Grammar School. He undertook National Service in the Royal Sussex Regiment between 1954 and 1956 at the rank of second lieutenant. He studied at Brasenose College, Oxford, graduating with first class honours in law (Bachelor of Arts) and a Bachelor of Civil Law degree, and where he won the Vinerian Scholarship. He was called to the bar by the Middle Temple in 1962, becoming a bencher in 1983, and became a Queen's Counsel in 1975. He co-edited Essays in Honour of Sir Brian Neill: the Quintessential Judge with Richard Susskind, former Gresham Professor of Law, and contributed to Civil Court Service 2007.

== Judicial career ==
Saville was appointed a judge of the High Court in 1985 and, as is tradition, was knighted at this time. In 1994, he became a Lord Justice of Appeal, a judge of the Court of Appeal of England and Wales, and was appointed to the Privy Council, affording him the style, The Right Honourable. On 28 July 1997, he replaced Lord Mustill as a Lord of Appeal in Ordinary, receiving a life peerage as Baron Saville of Newdigate, of Newdigate in the County of Surrey. He and nine other Lords of Appeal in Ordinary became Justices of the Supreme Court upon that body's inauguration on 1 October 2009. He sat as a crossbencher. On 10 July 2024, it was announced that Saville had retired from the House of Lords with effect from the 20 June 2024.

Between 1994 and 1996, Saville chaired a committee on arbitration law that led to the Arbitration Act 1996.

In 1997, he received an honorary LLD degree from London Guildhall University.

From 2006 to 2021, Saville held the post of President of The Academy of Experts.

== Bloody Sunday Inquiry ==
On 29 January 1998, Lord Saville of Newdigate was appointed to chair the second Bloody Sunday Inquiry, a public inquiry commissioned by Prime Minister Tony Blair into Bloody Sunday, an incident in 1972 in Derry, Northern Ireland, when 27 people were shot by members of the 1st Battalion of the Parachute Regiment, resulting in 14 deaths. The previous inquiry, the Widgery Tribunal, had been described by Irish nationalists as a whitewash. Other members of the panel were Sir Edward Somers, former judge of the Court of Appeal of New Zealand, and William Lloyd Hoyt, former Chief Justice of New Brunswick.

The report was published on 15 June 2010. British Prime Minister David Cameron addressed the House of Commons that afternoon where he acknowledged that the paratroopers had fired the first shot, had fired on fleeing unarmed civilians, and shot and killed one man who was already wounded. He then apologised on behalf of the British Government. The inquiry came into controversy for attempts to force journalists Alex Thomson, Lena Ferguson and Toby Harnden to disclose their sources, for its 12-year duration and for its final cost of £195 million.

== Personal life ==
Lord Saville of Newdigate married Jill Gray in 1961, with whom he has two sons (William Christian Saville and Henry Saville). He enjoys sailing, flying and computers, and is a member of the Garrick Club in London.
