= Bloody Sunday: Scenes from the Saville Inquiry =

Play written by Richard Norton-Taylor

- Oberon Books first edition cover
- Written by: Richard Norton-Taylor
- Original language: English
- Subject: A dramatisation of the hearings of evidence given of the 1972 violence in Derry, Northern Ireland.
- Genre: Drama

Premiere
- Date premiered: 7 April 2005
- Place premiered: Tricycle Theatre; London

Bloody Sunday: Scenes from the Saville Inquiry is a 2005 dramatisation by English journalist Richard Norton-Taylor of four years of evidence of the Saville Inquiry, distilled into two hours of stage performance by Tricycle Theatre in London.
