= William Lloyd Hoyt =

William Lloyd Hoyt OC QC

19th Chief Justice of New Brunswick
- In office 1993–1998
- Preceded by: Stuart G. Stratton
- Succeeded by: Joseph Daigle

25th President of the New Brunswick Branch of the Canadian Bar Association
- In office 1976–1977
- Preceded by: Wallace S. Turnbull
- Succeeded by: Wayne R. Chapman, Q.C.

Personal details
- Born: September 13, 1930 (age 96) Saint John, New Brunswick, Canada
- Education: B.A., M.A. Acadia University; B.A. (Law) and M.A., University of Cambridge
- Profession: Lawyer
- Awards: Order of Canada

William Lloyd Hoyt OC QC (born September 13, 1930) is a Canadian lawyer and judge. He was the chief justice of New Brunswick from 1993 to 1998.

== Early life and education ==
Born in Saint John, New Brunswick, Hoyt received a Bachelor of Arts degree and a Master of Arts degree from Acadia University in 1952. He received a Bachelor of Arts in Law from Emmanuel College, Cambridge in 1956 and a Master of Arts degree from Cambridge in 1979.

== Legal and judicial career ==
Hoyt was called to the Bar of New Brunswick in 1957 and joined the Fredericton law firm of Limerick & Limerick. He became a partner in 1959. From 1959 to 1961, he was a part-time lecturer at the University of New Brunswick Law School. He practised law until 1981, when he was made a judge of the Court of Queen's Bench of New Brunswick. In 1984, he was appointed to the New Brunswick Court of Appeal, where he served until 1998. He was Chief Justice of New Brunswick from 1993 to 1998.

== Canadian Bar Association ==
Hoyt is a member of the Canadian Bar Association, having served as president of the New Brunswick Branch of the CBA from 1976 to 1977.

In 1977, in the aftermath of the election of the separatist Parti Québécois government in 1976, he was asked to sit on the CBA Committee on the Constitution. The mandate of the Committee was to study and make recommendations on the Constitution of Canada. The 12 members of the Committee were drawn from each province of Canada, and included two future provincial premiers, a future Supreme Court of Canada justice, two future provincial chief justices (Hoyt and Clyde Wells), and a future Canadian Ambassador to the United Nations. The Committee presented its report to the CBA at the next annual meeting, in 1978. The Committee made wide-ranging recommendations for constitutional change, including a completely new constitution, abolishing the monarchy, changing the Senate, entrenching language rights and a bill of rights, and changing the balance of powers between the federal government and the provinces.

== "Bloody Sunday" inquiry ==
In 1998, the British government appointed Hoyt as a member of the Bloody Sunday Inquiry, set up to establish a definitive version of the events of Sunday 30 January 1972 in Derry, Northern Ireland. The other members of the Inquiry were Lord Saville, a lord of appeal in ordinary of the House of Lords and John Toohey, a retired judge of the High Court of Australia. The Inquiry prepared a major report which was tabled in Parliament in 2010, and found that British soldiers had shot at unarmed civilians. Prime Minister Cameron formally apologized in the House of Commons the day the report issued.

== Beaverbrook Art Gallery ==
Hoyt was also involved with the Beaverbrook Art Gallery, the provincial art gallery of New Brunswick. He was a Governor from 1979 to 1986 and was Chairman of the acquisitions committee from 1980 to 1986.

== Honours ==
- 1972 Queen's Counsel .
- 1977 Queen Elizabeth II Silver Jubilee Medal
- 1992 125th Anniversary of the Confederation of Canada Medal
- 1997 Honorary Doctorate of Laws (LL.D.), St. Thomas University.
- 1998 Honorary Doctorate of Laws (LL.D.), University of New Brunswick
- 2001 Honorary Doctorate of Civil Law (D.C.L.), Acadia University
- 2001 Honorary Fellow, Emmanuel College, University of Cambridge
- 2007 Officer of the Order of Canada in recognition for being "one of New Brunswick's most esteemed lawyers and jurists" and for "enhancing both Canada's role and reputation on the international stage" .
- 2012 Queen Elizabeth II Diamond Jubilee Medal
