= Bloody Sunday Inquiry =

Investigation into killings and shootings by British soldiers in Derry in 1972

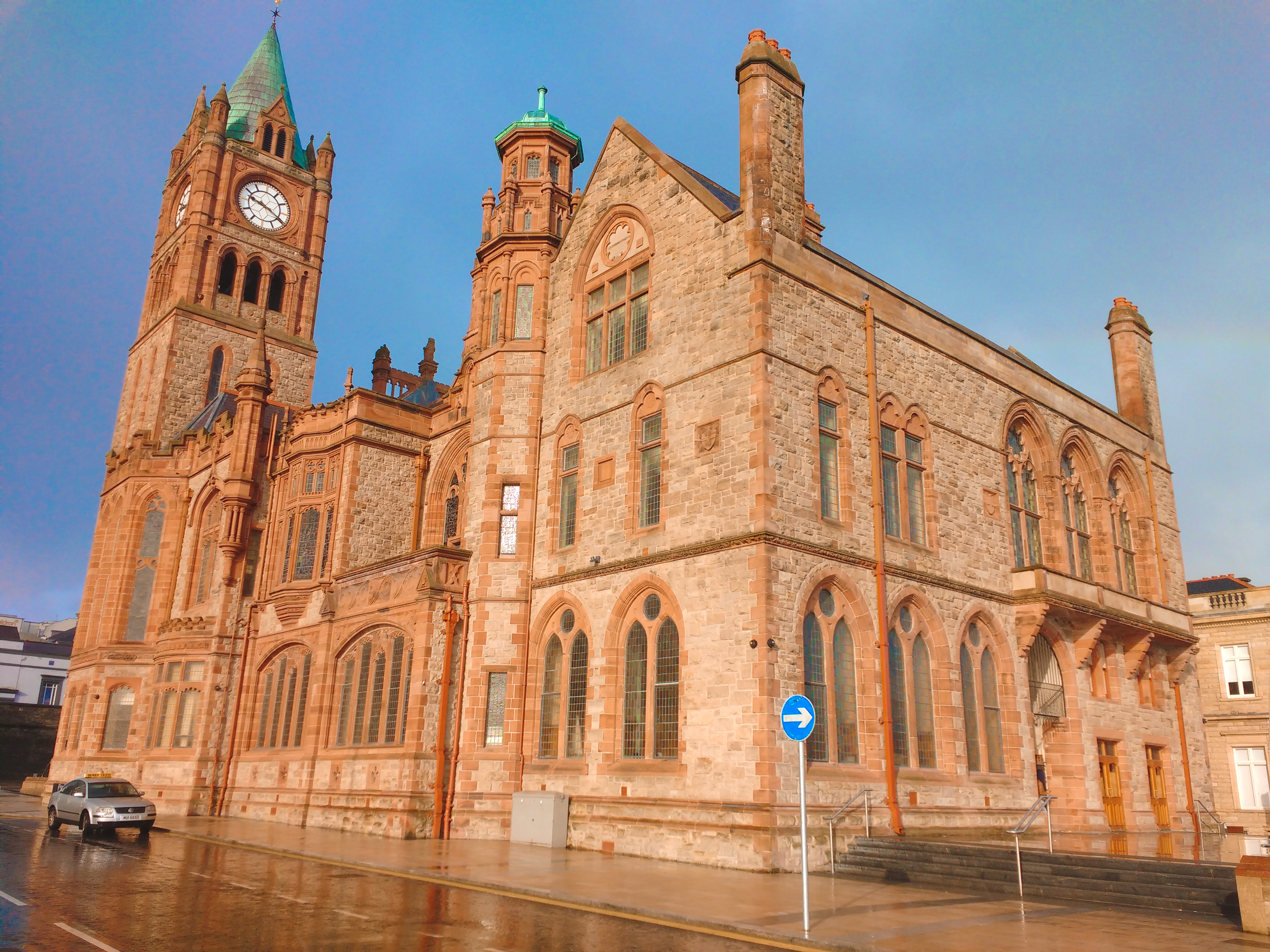
The Guildhall, Derry, location of the early part of the inquiry

The Bloody Sunday Inquiry, also known as the Saville Inquiry or the Saville Report, after its chairman, Lord Saville of Newdigate, was established in 1998 by British Prime Minister Tony Blair after campaigns for a second inquiry by families of those killed and injured in Derry on Bloody Sunday early in The Troubles. It was published on 15 June 2010. The inquiry was set up to establish a definitive version of the events of Sunday 30 January 1972. It superseded the tribunal set up under Lord Widgery, that had reported on 19 April 1972, only 11 weeks after the event, and which was accused of being a whitewash.

The inquiry took the form of a tribunal established under the Tribunals of Inquiry (Evidence) Act 1921. It consisted of Lord Saville, William L. Hoyt, the former Chief Justice of New Brunswick, and John L. Toohey, a former Justice of the High Court of Australia. Counsel to the inquiry was Christopher Clarke QC.

The judges finished hearing evidence on 23 November 2004, before reconvening on 16 December to listen to testimony from another witness, known as Witness X, who had been unavailable earlier.

The report was published on 15 June 2010. The British prime minister David Cameron addressed the House of Commons that afternoon where he acknowledged, among other things, that the paratroopers had fired the first shot, had fired on fleeing unarmed civilians and shot and killed one man who was already wounded. He then apologised on behalf of the British Government. Lord Saville defended the cost and timescale of the inquiry, which he considered thorough.

== Publication ==
The report of the inquiry was published on 15 June 2010. That morning thousands of people walked the path that the civil rights marchers had taken on Bloody Sunday before 13 were killed, holding photos of those who had been shot. The families of the victims received advance copies inside the Guildhall.

== Conclusions ==
The report stated, "The firing by soldiers of 1 PARA on Bloody Sunday caused the deaths of 13 people and injury to a similar number, none of whom was posing a threat of causing death or serious injury," and also said, "The immediate responsibility for the deaths and injuries on Bloody Sunday lies with those members of Support Company whose unjustifiable firing was the cause of those deaths and injuries." Saville stated that British paratroopers "lost control", fatally shooting fleeing civilians and those who tried to aid the civilians who had been shot by the Parachute Regiment. The report stated that soldiers involving in Bloody Sunday had concocted lies in their attempt to hide their acts. Saville stated that the civilians had not been warned by the British soldiers present that they intended to shoot. The report states, contrary to the previously established belief, that none of the soldiers fired in response to attacks by petrol bombers or stone throwers, and that the civilians were not posing any threat.

Saville said British soldiers should not have been ordered to enter the Bogside area as "Colonel Wilford either deliberately disobeyed Brigadier MacLellan’s order or failed for no good reason to appreciate the clear limits on what he had been authorised to do". The report stated five British soldiers aimed shots at civilians they knew did not pose a threat and two other British soldiers shot at civilians "in the belief that they might have identified gunmen, but without being certain that this was the case".

The report found that Martin McGuinness "did not engage in any activity that provided any of the soldiers with any justification for opening fire."

== Reactions to publication ==
Prime Minister David Cameron, addressing the House of Commons after the publication of the report on 15 June 2010, described what the British soldiers had done on that day as "both unjustified and unjustifiable", adding that "it was wrong". He acknowledged that all those who died were unarmed when they were killed by British soldiers and that a British soldier had fired the first shot at civilians. He also said that this was not a premeditated action, though "there was no point in trying to soften or equivocate" as "what happened should never, ever have happened". Cameron then apologised on behalf of the British Government by saying he was "deeply sorry".

Relatives of the civilians who had been killed in Bloody Sunday gave a "thumbs up" to the crowd which had gathered outside the Guildhall to hear the conclusions of the report and to listen to Cameron's apology on behalf of the British government. Crowds of people applauded upon hearing Cameron's apology broadcast on a giant screen which had been erected in the city. The New York Times called it "an extraordinary apology". Historian Paul Bew, writing in The Daily Telegraph, summed up the length of the inquiry as follows: "It is astonishing to think that when the tribunal, chaired by Lord Saville, began its work in 1998, David Cameron was not even in Parliament. Now, 38 years after the event itself, Bloody Sunday has come back to haunt another British prime minister".

The Belfast Telegraph quoted Labour MP Harriet Harman as saying that the report spoke for itself, but that given its length, many groups regrettably would likely be spurred to, and be able to, identify enough in the report to justify a predictable "flogging of traditional hobby horses".

== Criticism ==
One lawyer representing soldiers involved in the enquiry stated that Lord Saville had "cherry picked" the evidence in his inquiry and that Lord Saville had felt under pressure to give a verdict that was not borne out by the available evidence. This view was later echoed by a former paratrooper writing in the Belfast Telegraph that the Saville Inquiry was one-sided and did not reflect events of the day as he experienced them.

Ulster Unionist Party leader Sir Reg Empey criticised the inquiry itself, questioning the benefit of reliving the "darkest years" of Northern Ireland's history after 40 years, and also contrasting the £190m Saville Inquiry into 13 deaths with the absence of any inquiries into the deaths of people at the hands of paramilitary groups during the same period. This second criticism was also echoed in comments from Protestants reported in The Belfast Telegraph that the report created an unjust hierarchy in which the victims of Bloody Sunday were unfairly elevated above the more numerous victims of IRA violence.

Saville said he had "no regrets" over the time taken for and cost of the inquiry, if it was to be seen to be "thorough".

== Timeline ==
=== 2000 ===
The Bloody Sunday Inquiry opened properly in 2000 when formal public hearings began at the Guildhall in Derry. The Inquiry held public hearings on 116 days over the year, clocking up more than 600 hours of evidence. The vast majority of the evidence was from eyewitnesses.

In August, the inquiry ordered the soldiers who had opened fire to return to Derry to give their evidence. However, in December the Court of Appeal overruled the inquiry and accepted that the former soldiers would be in danger from dissident republicans should they return to Northern Ireland.

=== 2001 ===
The inquiry heard that there may be a "wall of silence" in Derry over what exactly members of the Provisional Irish Republican Army (IRA) were doing on the day. The allegations persisted when a witness in February 2001 refused to name a man he said had fired at soldiers. After months of speculation, Sinn Féin's Martin McGuinness announced that he would give evidence to the inquiry.

=== 2002 ===
The inquiry relocated to the Westminster Central Hall in London to hear evidence from former British Army soldiers, who claimed they feared being attacked by dissident republicans if they travelled to Derry.

=== 2004 ===
The judges retired on 23 November 2004. They reconvened once again on 16 December to listen to testimony from another key witness, known as Witness X.

=== 2007 ===
Publication of the Inquiry's Report was expected at the end of 2007, or possibly early 2008.

=== 2008 ===
On 8 February 2008, Secretary of State for Northern Ireland, Shaun Woodward revealed that the Bloody Sunday Inquiry was still costing £500,000 a month although it had not held hearings since 2005. The total cost of the Inquiry had reached £181.2m (by December 2007) and would not report until the second half of 2008. More than half of the overall cost is believed to have been for legal bills for the Inquiry. On 6 November 2008, the chairman of the Inquiry, Lord Saville, revealed that his report into the events of Bloody Sunday would not be completed for at least a further year. The inquiry's final report had been expected to be completed by the end of 2008 and published in early 2009.

=== 2009 ===
The chairman of the inquiry, Lord Saville, revealed that the inquiry report would be handed to the government in March 2010, some nine years after the first evidence was heard, a delay which Lord Saville admitted was "extremely disappointing". Shaun Woodward said he had been "profoundly shocked" by the new delay, adding "I am concerned at the impact on the families of those who lost loved ones and those who were injured".

=== 2010 ===
The Saville Report was handed to government lawyers on 24 March 2010, twelve years after the inquiry was established. The government lawyers then checked the report for evidence which could pose a threat to "national security". The report was given to Owen Paterson, the newly appointed Secretary of State, who decided on an appropriate date to publish the report. John Kelly, whose brother Michael was killed on Bloody Sunday, said the families feared the report "will fall victim to selective leakage and other partisan usage long before the full report sees the light of day" and urged the Secretary of State to publish the report as soon as possible. On 26 May 2010 it was announced that the Saville Report would be published on 15 June. Comments in the press emphasised the financial cost of the inquiry, and the ways in which this could overshadow its legal and moral value.

Shortly before the publication of the long-awaited Saville Report, it was announced that soldiers from the Parachute Regiment would be returning to Helmand in Afghanistan on operations for the third tour in four years in October and commanders believed that the report could cause a "morale-damaging backlash" against the British Army if the reports were not viewed in the context of the violence and chaos that had engulfed Northern Ireland in 1972 and that while there should be no attempt to justify the killing of civilians by British paratroopers, senior defence officials emphasised that the events of Bloody Sunday were "a tragedy which belonged to another era" and should not reflect badly on present day armed forces.

== Controversy over cost and duration ==
The Bloody Sunday Inquiry generated controversy due to its prolonged nature, mounting costs and questions regarding its relevance.

Some like Peter Oborne labelled the inquiry a "shambles", estimating its final cost at "more than £200 million". He has suggested that while "Most people... accept that in Northern Ireland the only way forward is by casting a veil of obscurity over the past": however the Saville inquiry marks the "one exception to this rule: the British army"; whose "conduct... is being put under a microscope by the Saville public inquiry".

The inquiry caused further controversy when on 4 July 2006 the Government revealed its cost to the taxpayer in an attempt "to block an official inquiry into the 7 July London bombings". "Tessa Jowell, let slip on BBC TV's Sunday AM programme that 'the latest estimate... is about £400 million'": an amount labelled by "Downing Street and ministers" as an "'awful' cost":

In response to questions about the Bloody Sunday inquiry, Government officials were unable to explain why the cost was more than double the estimates given publicly. Miss Jowell's aides confirmed that she had repeated a figure given to her by John Reid, the Home Secretary, who when he was the Northern Ireland secretary had challenged the hefty fees being charged by lawyers at the inquiry.

Blair's official spokesman later agreed that costs had run out of control, saying that the inquiry had taken a "long time and cost an awful lot of money". It heard from more than 900 witnesses before it ended last November and Lord Saville retired to write his report.

David Lidington, the Conservative Northern Ireland spokesman, said the costs were "scandalous". He would be asking in Parliament why there had been such a dramatic increase. Conservative party figures said the inquiry had cost everyone in the country £6.64. The total of £400 million would have paid for [a year's salary for] more than 15,000 nurses, nearly 5,000 doctors and 11,000 policemen, or 13 extra Apache helicopters for troops in Iraq and Afghanistan.

== See also ==
- Northern Ireland peace process
