= 1st Battalion, Parachute Regiment =

Airborne light infantry unit of the British Army

1st Battalion, the Parachute Regiment
- Cap badge of the Parachute Regiment
- Active: 1941—1948; 1948—Present
- Country: United Kingdom
- Branch: British Army
- Type: Airborne Forces
- Role: Air Assault; Special Operations
- Size: Battalion
- Part of: Special Forces Support Group
- Mottos: Utrinque Paratus (Latin for "Ready for Anything")

Insignia
- Drop zone flash

The 1st Battalion, Parachute Regiment (1 PARA), is a battalion of the Parachute Regiment within the British Army and forms the principal component of the Special Forces Support Group (SFSG), a tri-service formation that includes personnel from across the British Armed Forces.

An airborne light infantry battalion with a specialised role, 1 PARA is trained and equipped to support United Kingdom Special Forces in a range of high-readiness operations. Within the SFSG, its roles include acting as a quick reaction force for Special Air Service and Special Boat Service operations; establishing outer cordons and securing areas of operation; supporting large-scale offensive actions alongside special forces units; conducting diversionary or secondary assaults; and providing blocking forces against counter-attacks. Additional responsibilities include training and mentoring foreign military forces and contributing to domestic counter-terrorism duties. The battalion provides the majority of manpower to the SFSG, with paratroopers from the 2nd and 3rd Battalions eligible to apply for selection after a minimum period of service, and is based at MOD St Athan in Vale of Glamorgan, Wales.

== History ==
The 1st Battalion, The Parachute Regiment was officially formed on 15 September 1941 from the 11th Special Air Service Battalion, which had evolved from No. 2 Commando. Initially based at Hardwick Hall near Chesterfield, the battalion conducted parachute training at No. 1 Parachute Training School at Ringway, near Manchester. Training encompassed parachute drills, packing, jumps from Tatton Park in Whitley aircraft, and intensive infantry exercises in assault tactics, small arms, and demolition. Soldiers were paid two shillings per day during training. Lieutenant Colonel S. J. L. Hill assumed command, overseeing the organization of companies and support elements drawn from volunteers across the British Army.

=== Tunisia Campaign ===
In November 1942, 1 PARA deployed to North Africa as part of the 1st Parachute Brigade under Brigadier Richard Gale, alongside the 2nd and 3rd Parachute Battalions. Their first operational mission was the capture and control of Beja, a key road junction on the Souk el Khemis Plain. Parachuting onto open terrain near Souk el Arba from American Dakota aircraft, the battalion reassembled under potential enemy fire. For the remainder of the campaign, 1 PARA operated largely as line infantry, conducting offensive sweeps, defensive positions, and patrols against German and Italian forces of the Afrika Korps. Harsh desert conditions, including heat and limited water, tested both endurance and equipment. During these operations, the regiment earned the nickname “Red Devils” from German opponents for their aggressive attacks and resilience under fire.

=== Sicily – Operation Fustian ===
Following Tunisia, 1 PARA participated in Operation Fustian during the Allied invasion of Sicily on 13 July 1943, tasked with capturing and holding the Primosole Bridge over the Simeto River to enable the British Eighth Army’s advance toward Catania and to prevent Axis reinforcements from intervening. Under Lieutenant Colonel A. S. Pearson, the battalion was dropped on the scattered Catania Plain alongside the 2nd and 3rd Parachute Battalions. Poor navigation and enemy anti-aircraft fire caused widely dispersed landings. Companies regrouped under small-unit leadership to assault entrenched German Fallschirmjäger and Italian forces. Fighting involved both coordinated fire and close-quarters engagements. The battalion held the bridge until relieved by advancing Eighth Army units, preventing its demolition, despite significant casualties and challenging terrain.

=== Taranto, Italy ===
After Sicily, 1 PARA conducted a sea-borne operation at Taranto Harbour on 11 September 1943. Companies landed under potential observation and moved through urban and industrial areas to secure port facilities, prevent sabotage, and enable further Allied operations. Reconnaissance patrols advanced north toward Foggia, identifying fortified positions and minefields. After stabilizing the area, the battalion returned to the UK, where it was based at Grimsthorpe Castle in Lincolnshire to consolidate, retrain, and prepare for the next phase of operations in northwestern Europe.

=== Arnhem – Operation Market Garden ===
1 PARA’s most renowned action occurred during Operation Market Garden in September 1944, aimed at seizing bridges in the Netherlands to enable a rapid Allied advance into Germany. On 17 September, the battalion dropped onto Renkum Heath, west of Arnhem, under the command of Lieutenant Colonel D. Dobie. Its mission was to advance north and link with the 2nd Battalion holding the Arnhem bridge. The battalion faced entrenched elements of the 9th and 10th SS Panzer Divisions, encountering heavy small-arms, machine gun, and mortar fire. Lieutenant Colonel Dobie was wounded and captured during the advance. Companies attempted repeatedly to reach the isolated 2nd Battalion but were repelled. The survivors withdrew to the Oosterbeek perimeter, reduced to roughly 100 effective personnel, and defended alongside Lonsdale Force. After several days under siege, they were evacuated across the Rhine to Driel and then Nijmegen. The battalion suffered extremely heavy casualties, effectively removing it from further combat operations for the remainder of the war, though its actions delayed German consolidation and aided the overall strategic objectives of the Allied advance.

=== Palestine ===
Following the end of hostilities in Europe, the remnants of 1 PARA were gradually brought back to full strength in the United Kingdom. The battalion had seen heavy attrition during Arnhem and required extensive retraining and reorganization. In 1946, 1 PARA was reconstituted and assigned to the 6th Airborne Division, deploying to Haifa in Mandatory Palestine during a period of escalating civil unrest. The battalion operated in urban and rural environments, performing patrols, security operations, and escort duties amid the tensions between Jewish and Arab populations. Their tasks included checkpoint control, convoys through hostile areas, and rapid-response interventions during incidents of sabotage and armed attacks. The battalion remained in Palestine until the British withdrawal in 1948, at which point it was temporarily disbanded, and personnel were absorbed into other airborne units.

The present-day 1 PARA was reformed shortly afterward from the 4th and 6th Parachute Battalions, re-designated as the 1st Battalion, The Parachute Regiment, and stationed at Furness Barracks in Lübeck, Germany, returning to the UK in 1949. This reconstitution preserved the historical lineage and battle honours of the original unit.

=== Cyprus, Suez, Bahrain, Aden ===
From mid-1951 to 1954, 1 PARA conducted operational tours in Cyprus, the Suez Canal Zone in Egypt, and later during counter-terrorist operations against the EOKA insurgency in Cyprus in 1956. The battalion was involved in internal security operations, patrolling urban centres and rural villages, conducting cordon-and-search operations, and countering ambushes and roadside attacks. During the Suez Crisis in November 1956, 1 PARA participated in the amphibious landings, securing beachheads and advancing inland to protect key infrastructure and facilitate the overall Anglo-French operation, before returning to Cyprus to resume counter-insurgency operations through 1958.

During the 1960s, the battalion served in Bahrain between 1962 and 1966, providing security for the garrison and performing ceremonial duties, while also preparing for potential regional crises. In early 1964, the battalion undertook a United Nations peacekeeping tour in Cyprus, contributing to the UNFICYP mission to stabilize tensions between Greek and Turkish Cypriot communities, before returning to Bahrain for a second tour in 1965–66. In 1967, 1 PARA participated in the withdrawal from Aden, a complex operation involving the evacuation of British personnel and assets following the end of colonial administration, conducted under the constant threat of insurgent attacks.

=== Northern Ireland – Operation Banner ===
1 PARA’s first tour of Northern Ireland under Operation Banner began at the end of 1969 and marked the start of a total of 96 months of service in the province, spread intermittently through to September 2005. Early operations involved urban patrols, cordon-and-search operations, and the establishment of checkpoints in areas of high sectarian tension. The battalion was involved in notable and controversial incidents, including the events surrounding Bloody Sunday in Derry on 30 January 1972, when soldiers opened fire on unarmed protesters. Over subsequent years, 1 PARA undertook multiple tours, combining urban security, counter-terrorism duties, and support to the Royal Ulster Constabulary and Ulster Defence Regiment. The battalion’s activities encompassed residential security, rapid-reaction patrols, and reinforcement of other military units during periods of escalated violence.

During this period, the battalion also deployed for UN peacekeeping operations in Cyprus in 1973, based at Polemidhia Camp with UNFICYP, and conducted ceremonial duties alongside operational training. In 1974, 1 PARA received new regimental colours, the first since 1950, reflecting its continued status as a front-line airborne battalion. Following two years stationed in Berlin, which included the staging of the Army’s largest ceremonial tattoo, the battalion moved to the Netherlands to participate in the filming of A Bridge Too Far, conducting 927 parachute descents from eleven Dakota aircraft as part of the production while maintaining operational readiness. A further UN tour in Cyprus followed in late 1976, based at St David’s Camp, before returning to the UK.

=== Cold War ===
Upon the disbandment of the 16th Parachute Brigade in 1977, 1 PARA became part of the 6th Field Force and conducted an emergency tour in Hong Kong in 1980, preparing for potential civil unrest or external threats during the colony’s final decade under British administration. Subsequent years included three years of public duties in Edinburgh, followed by a move to Bulford in January 1983, assuming the role within the Ace Mobile Force Land (AMF(L)). The battalion subsequently spent four winters in Norway as the Army’s designated Mountain and Arctic Battalion, conducting extended cold-weather training, survival exercises, and large-scale manoeuvres in sub-zero conditions, before returning to Aldershot in May 1987 to join the newly formed 5th Airborne Brigade.

=== Recent ===
Training and four additional tours in Northern Ireland preceded the battalion’s first conventional deployment since Suez in 1956. On 6 June 1999, the 1 PARA Battle Group, reinforced by 125 personnel from 3 PARA, deployed to Macedonia under the 5th Airborne Brigade to spearhead NATO KFOR’s entry into Kosovo. The operation aimed to secure the Kacanik Defile on the Serbian-Macedonian border and prevent any hard-line Serbian forces from obstructing their negotiated withdrawal.

On 9 June, the battalion conducted an air-mobile helicopter insertion to secure the Kacanik Defile. Multiple platoons were lifted simultaneously, with each securing designated entry points along the defile. Following the insertion, 1 PARA advanced on foot and in light vehicles toward Pristina, establishing checkpoints and forward positions. In the city, platoons were assigned to monitor specific districts, protect Serb civilians, and negotiate with Kosovo Liberation Army elements. Teams systematically collected evidence of war crimes, documented incidents of reprisal violence, and maintained observation posts along major routes. The battalion’s operations continued until 30 July, when responsibility for civil administration was transferred to the 1 Royal Irish Battle Group. Personnel received one Distinguished Service Order, one Queen’s Commendation for Bravery, and a Mention in Despatches.

In May 2000, a 1 PARA Battle Group deployed to Freetown, Sierra Leone, to protect UK and other civilians under threat from rebel forces. Companies were dispersed to secure key points, including the airport and evacuation assembly areas. Units conducted perimeter security, established defensive positions, and maintained rapid reaction forces capable of responding to rebel activity. During Operation Palliser, patrols conducted area control and coordinated with Sierra Leonean forces and international agencies to stabilise zones for evacuation. In September 2000, A Company was deployed on Operation Barras, a rescue mission for British hostages held by the West Side Boys. The operation involved coordinated helicopter insertions, simultaneous breaches of compound perimeters, suppression of armed insurgents, and extraction under hostile conditions, with all hostages recovered.

In February 2003, 1 PARA, as part of the 16th Air Assault Brigade, advanced into southern Iraq. Companies were assigned to secure the Rumaylah and West Qurnah oil fields and control the main south–north route to Basra. 1 PARA took operational responsibility for Al Amarah in northern Maysan Province. Forward operating bases were established along key urban centers and rural routes. Daily operations involved foot and vehicle patrols, convoy security, route clearance, and search operations in villages suspected of militia activity.

In June 2003, two multiples of No. 8 Platoon were engaged in Majar al-Kabir when a crowd surrounded them. Platoon elements formed defensive positions, returning fire with small arms while using armoured vehicles for cover. Coordinated withdrawal was conducted under continuous attack. Simultaneously, a nearby police station was overrun, resulting in the deaths of six Royal Military Policemen of 156 Provost Company. Patrols remained at heightened alert following this engagement, conducting regular route patrols, establishing observation posts, and manning checkpoints to prevent further escalation. 1 PARA returned to the United Kingdom in July 2003.

In 2006, the battalion relocated to RAF St Athan in Wales, consolidating airborne and air-mobile training capabilities.

== See also ==
- 2nd Battalion, Parachute Regiment
- 3rd Battalion, Parachute Regiment
- 4th Battalion, Parachute Regiment
- Pathfinder Platoon
- List of Second World War British airborne battalions
