= Parachute Regiment in the media =

This article is about the British Parachute Regiment. For other nations airborne forces, see List of paratrooper forces

== Films ==
- Theirs Is the Glory (1946)
- The Red Beret (1953)
- The Longest Day (1962)
- A Bridge Too Far (1977)
- Kommando Leopard (1985)
- Bloody Sunday (2002)
- Dead Man's Shoes(2004)
- The Last Drop (2006)
- Cars 2 (2011)
- Kajaki (2014)

== TV shows ==
- The Sandbaggers (1978)
- The Paras, BBC (1983)
- Contact (1985)
- Civvies (1992)
- P-Company, Channel 4 Documentary (1992)
- Band of Brothers episode 5: Crossroads (2001)
- PARA Platoon (2014)
- The Paras: Men of War (2019)

== Video games ==
- Battlefield 5 (2016)
- Call of Duty: Vanguard (2021)
