= Parachute Regiment (United Kingdom) =

Infantry regiment of the British Army

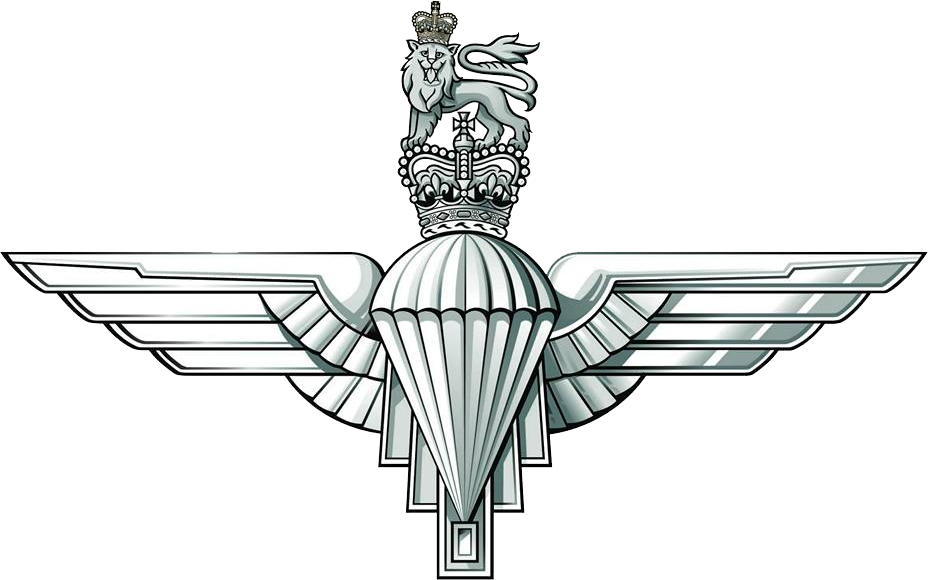
- Active: 1942 – present
- Country: United Kingdom
- Branch: British Army
- Type: 1st Battalion – United Kingdom Special Forces; 2nd Battalion – Airborne Infantry; 3rd Battalion – Airborne Infantry; 4th Battalion – Airborne Infantry (Reserves)
- Role: Expeditionary warfare Special operations Parachute insertion
- Size: 2,110 personnel (2023): 210 Officers; 1,820 Other Ranks
- Part of: Guards and Parachute Division
- Garrison/HQ: RHQ – Colchester; 1st Battalion – St Athan; 2nd Battalion – Colchester; 3rd Battalion – Colchester; 4th Battalion – Pudsey
- Nicknames: "The Paras" "Red Devils"
- Mottos: "Utrinque Paratus" (Latin) "Ready for anything"
- March: Quick – Ride of the Valkyries; Slow – Pomp and Circumstance No 4
- Mascot: Shetland Pony (Pegasus)
- Website: www.army.mod.uk/who-we-are/corps-regiments-and-units/infantry/parachute-regiment/

Commanders
- Colonel-in-Chief: King Charles III
- Colonel Commandant: Major General Ollie Kingsbury
- Notable commanders: Sir Anthony Farrar-Hockley; Sir Roland Gibbs; Sir Mike Jackson; Sir Rupert Smith

Insignia
- Parachute Wings

- Drop zone flashes

The Parachute Regiment, known colloquially as the Paras, is the airborne and elite infantry regiment of the British Army. The first battalion is part of the Special Forces Support Group under the operational command of the Director Special Forces. The other battalions are the parachute infantry component of the British Army's rapid response formation, 16 Air Assault Brigade. Alongside the five regiments of Foot Guards, the Parachute Regiment is the only infantry regiment of the British Army that has not been amalgamated with another unit since the end of the Second World War.

The Parachute Regiment was formed on 22 June 1940 during the Second World War and eventually raised 17 battalions. In Europe, these battalions formed part of the 1st Airborne Division, the 6th Airborne Division and the 2nd Independent Parachute Brigade Group. Another three battalions served with the British Indian Army in India and Burma. The regiment took part in six major parachute assault operations in North Africa, Italy, Greece, France, the Netherlands and Germany, often landing ahead of all other troops.

At the end of the Second World War, the regiment was reduced to three regular army battalions first assigned to the 16th Parachute Brigade and later the 5th Airborne Brigade. The reserve 16th Airborne Division was formed using the regiment reserve battalions in the Territorial Army. Defence cuts gradually reduced the TA formations to a parachute brigade and then a single reserve battalion. In the same time period, the regular army battalions have taken part in operations in Suez, Cyprus, Borneo, Aden, Northern Ireland, the Falklands, the Kosovo War, the Balkans, Sierra Leone, Iraq and Afghanistan, at times being reinforced by men from the reserve battalion.

== Formation ==
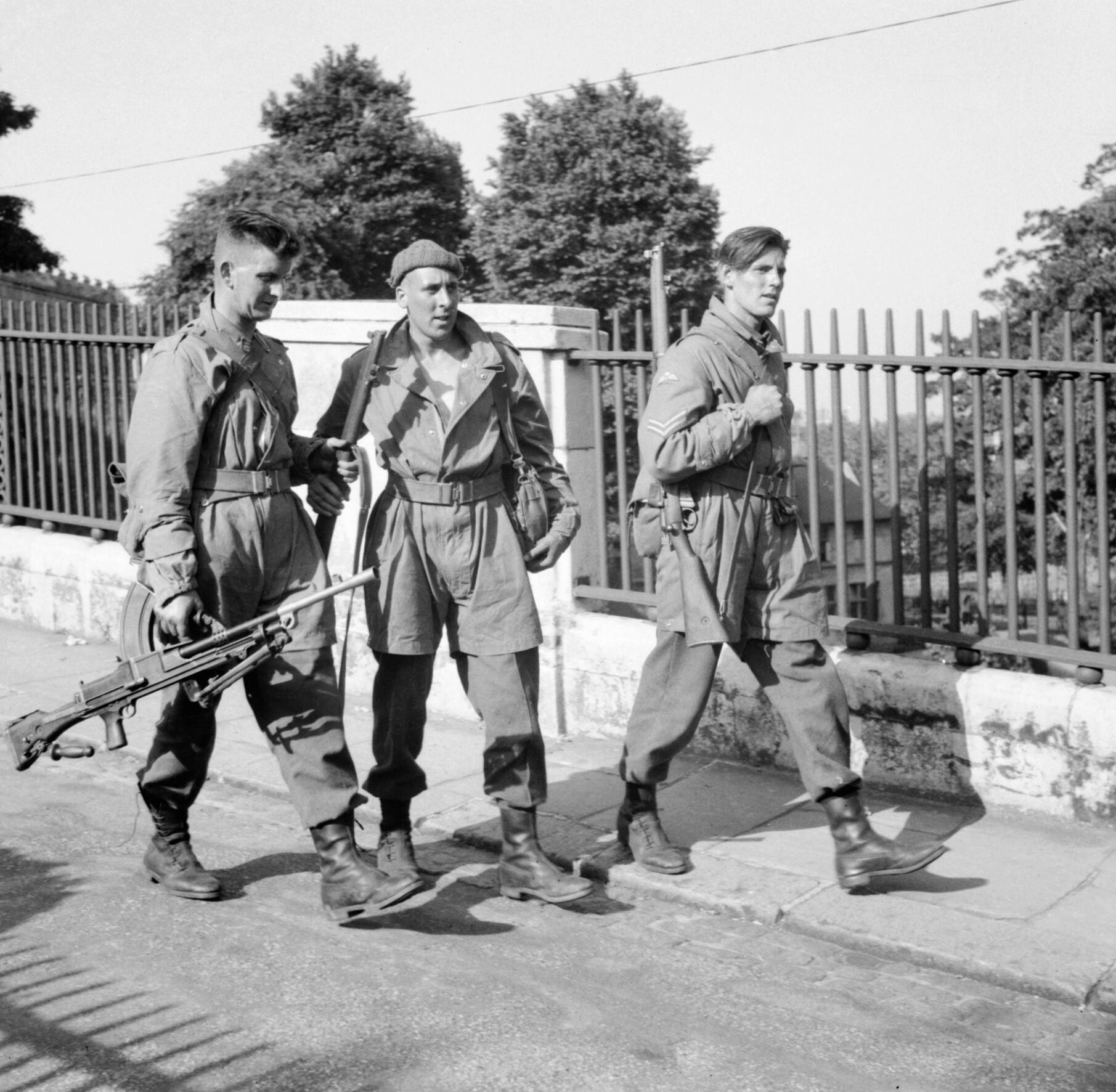
British parachute troops on exercise in Norwich 23 June 1941

Impressed by the success of German airborne operations, during the Battle of France, the British Prime Minister, Winston Churchill, directed the War Office to investigate the possibility of creating a corps of 5,000 parachute troops. On 22 June 1940, No. 2 Commando was turned over to parachute duties and on 21 November, re-designated the 11th Special Air Service Battalion, with a parachute and glider wing. It was these men who took part in the first British airborne operation, Operation Colossus, on 10 February 1941. In September, the battalion was re-designated the 1st Parachute Battalion and assigned to the 1st Parachute Brigade. To fill out the brigade, the 2nd, 3rd and 4th Parachute Battalions were raised by calling for volunteers from all units in the British Army.

The first operation by the Parachute Regiment was Operation Biting in February 1942. The objective was to capture a Würzburg radar on the coast of France. The raid was carried out by 'C' Company, 2nd Parachute Battalion, under the command of Major John Frost.

The success of the raid prompted the War Office to expand the existing airborne force, setting up the Airborne Forces Depot and Battle School in Derbyshire in April 1942, and creating the Parachute Regiment as well as converting a number of infantry battalions into airborne battalions in August 1942. The 2nd Parachute Brigade was then formed from the 4th Battalion, transferred from the 1st Para Brigade, and two of the converted infantry battalions, the 5th Battalion from the 7th Queen's Own Cameron Highlanders and 6th Battalion from the 10th Royal Welch Fusiliers. The Army Air Corps was created as the command formation of the Parachute Regiment and the Glider Pilot Regiment. With two parachute brigades now in the order of battle, the 1st Airborne Division commanded by Major-General Frederick Arthur Montague Browning was formed. By the end of the war, the regiment had raised 17 battalions.

In India, the 50th Indian Parachute Brigade was raised on 27 October 1941, comprising 151 (British), 152 (Indian) and 153 (Gurkha) Parachute Battalions along with the brigade signals, sapper squadron and 80 Parachute Field Ambulance. 151 British Parachute Battalion moved to Egypt and then to England where it was redesignated 156 Parachute battalion and joined the 4th Parachute Brigade, 1st Airborne Division. The British battalion was composed of volunteers from the 27 infantry battalions of the British Army in India. The 2nd/7th Gurkha Battalion was converted en bloc to the airborne role and renamed 154th (Gurkha) Parachute Battalion. Later, when the formation was to expand, 14th and 77th Indian Parachute Brigades from the Chindit operations were converted and comprised one airborne battalion each of British, Indian and Gurkha troops. They were part of the 44th Indian Airborne Division.

=== Training ===
Parachute training (1942)

Parachute training was a 12-day course carried out at the No. 1 Parachute Training School, RAF Ringway. Recruits initially jumped from a converted barrage balloon and finished with five parachute jumps from an aircraft. Anyone failing to complete a parachute jump was returned to his old unit. At the end of the course, new Paras were presented with their maroon beret and parachute wings and posted to a parachute battalion. Parachute training was not without its dangers; three men were killed in the first 2,000 parachute jumps at Ringway.

Airborne soldiers were expected to fight against superior numbers of the enemy equipped with artillery and tanks. So training was designed to encourage a spirit of self-discipline, self-reliance and aggressiveness. Emphasis was given to physical fitness, marksmanship and fieldcraft. A large part of the training consisted of assault courses and route marching. Military exercises included capturing and holding airborne bridgeheads, road or rail bridges and coastal fortifications. At the end of most exercises, the battalion would march back to their barracks. An ability to cover long distances at speed was expected: airborne platoons were required to cover a distance of 50 miles (80 km) in 24 hours, and battalions 32 miles (51 km).

=== Equipment ===
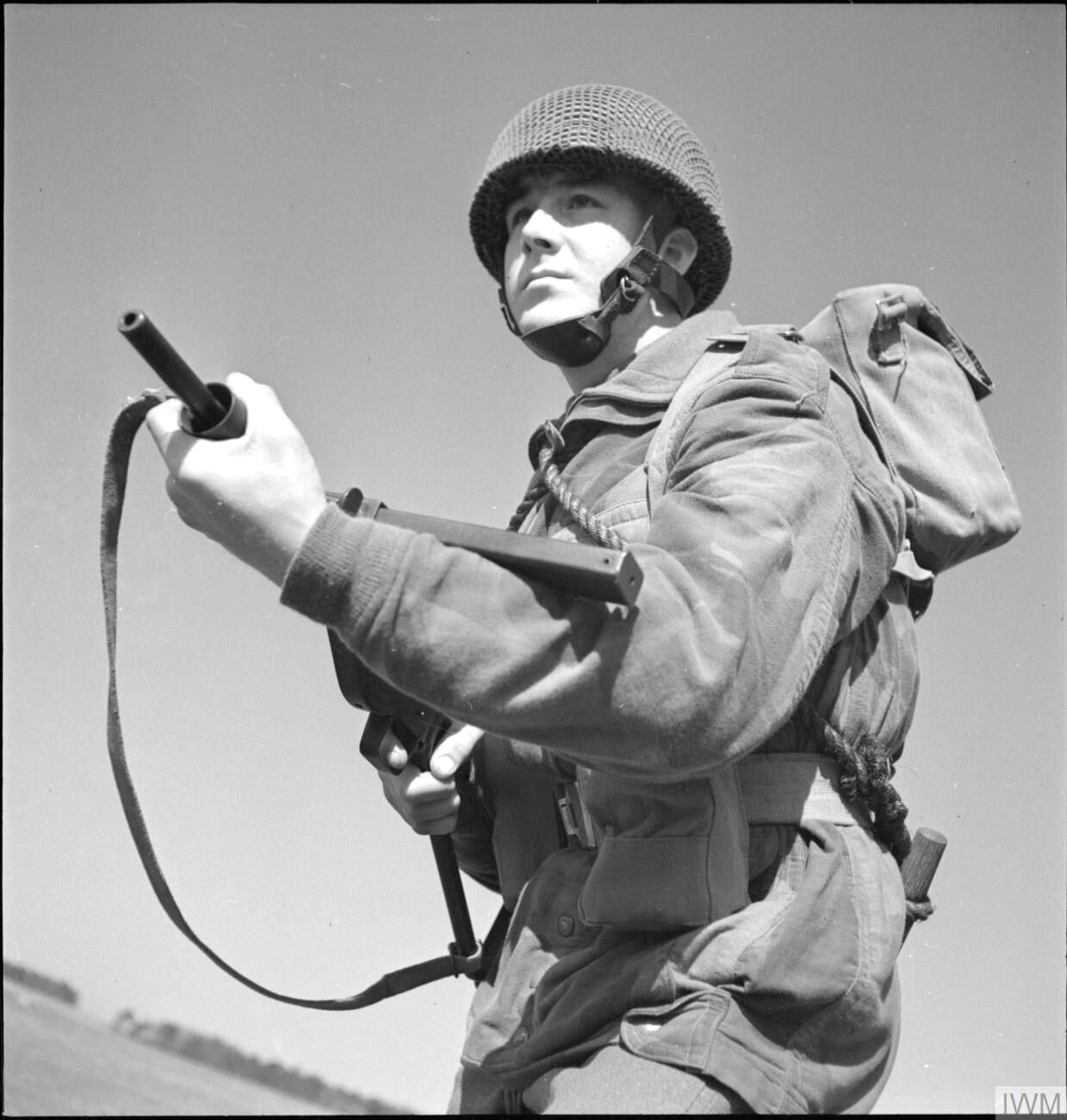
British paratrooper of the 8th Parachute Battalion armed with the Sten gun wearing the airborne forces steel helmet and the Denison Smock (1943).

The Parachute Regiment had their own distinctive uniform: the maroon beret at first with the Army Air Corps cap badge and from May 1943 the Parachute Regiment cap badge which is still in use today. Parachute wings were worn on the right shoulder above the airborne forces patch of Bellerophon riding the flying horse Pegasus. (Note: The airborne forces patch was chosen by Lieutenant-General Frederick Arthur Montague Browning. The emblem was designed by Major Edward Seago, to be worn on the arms of all Airborne soldiers.) On operations, Paras wore the airborne forces pattern steel helmet instead of the normal Brodie helmet. Initially they wore a 'jump jacket' modelled on the German Fallschirmjäger jacket. After 1942, the Denison smock was issued as the first camouflaged uniform for the British Army. In 1943, a green sleeveless jacket was designed to wear over the Denison smock when parachuting. British Paras did not use a reserve parachute, as the War Office considered the £60 cost a waste of money.

The Parachute Regiment were not issued any special weapons. Their small arms were the same as the rest of the army's: the bolt action Lee–Enfield rifle and the Enfield or Webley revolver or the M1911 pistol. For a submachine gun, they used the British Sten in Northwest Europe, which was issued in higher numbers than to a normal infantry battalion. Paratroopers attached to Eighth Army used the Thompson submachine gun in the North African and Mediterranean theatre and during Operation Dragoon. Each section had a Bren light machine gun and the platoon had a 2-inch mortar. The only battalion heavy weapons were eight 3-inch mortars, four Vickers machine guns and after 1943, ten PIAT anti tank weapons.

=== Post-war formations and reductions ===
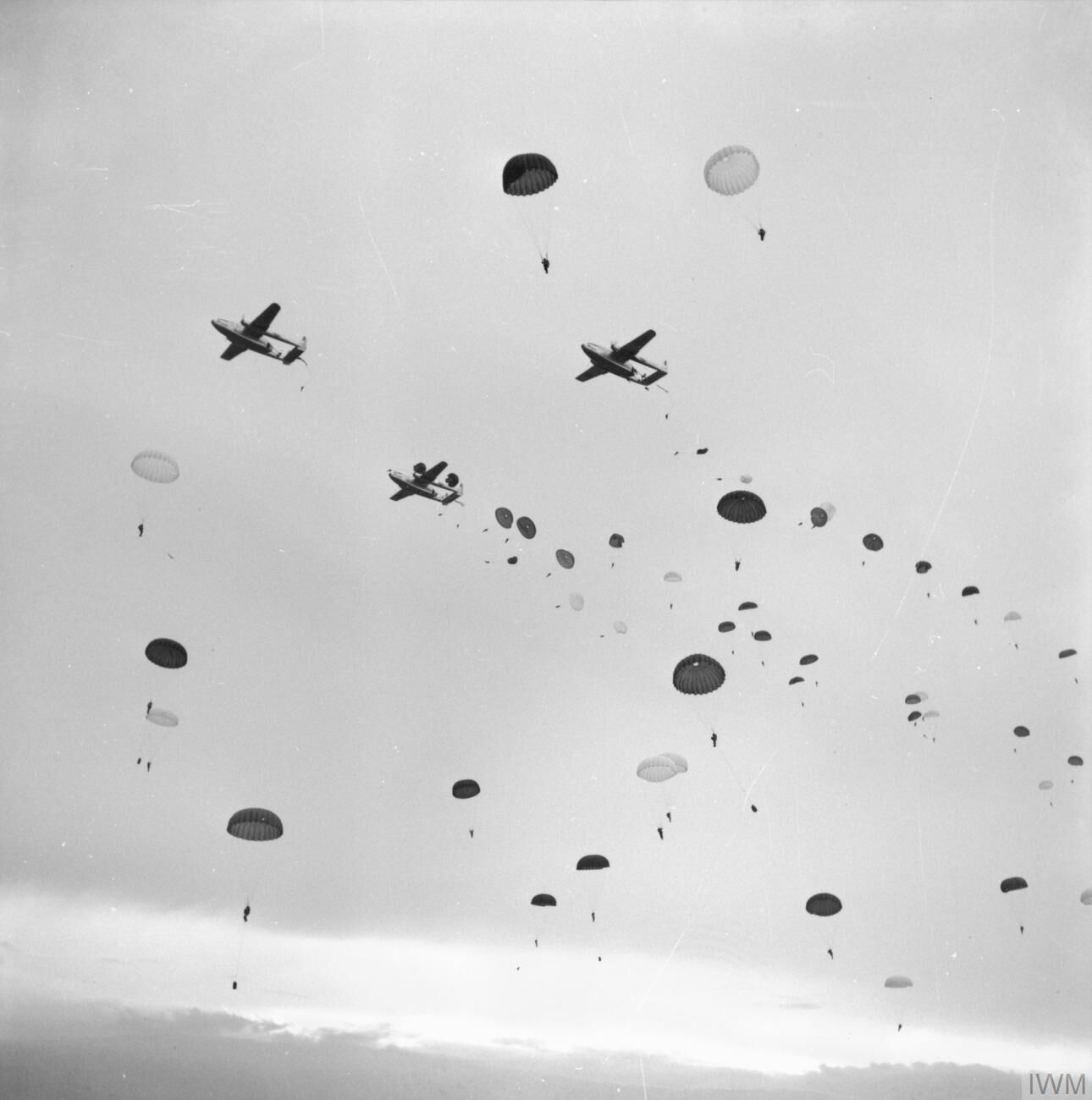
September 1953 parachute exercise by the 16th Airborne Division

The airborne divisions were disbanded after the Second World War, with only the 2nd Parachute Brigade (1st, 2nd and 3rd Battalions) remaining. In February 1948, it was renumbered the 16th Parachute Brigade and posted to the British Army on the Rhine. The brigade remained in Germany until October 1949, when it relocated to Aldershot, which became the home of the Parachute Regiment for the next 50 years. The Territorial Army (TA) reformed after the war and raised the 16th Airborne Division with nine parachute battalions (10th to 18th) in three parachute brigades. The division was disbanded in the 1956 defence cuts, leaving the 44th Independent Parachute Brigade as the only reserve parachute formation. The remaining reserve battalions were the 10th (City of London), 12th (Yorkshire), 13th (Lancashire), 15th (Scottish) and 17th (Durham Light Infantry). Further reductions resulted in the amalgamation of the 12th and 13th Battalions soon afterwards. In 1967, the TA battalions were reduced again, the 12th, 13th and 17th being amalgamated to reform the 4th Battalion. The 44th Independent Parachute Brigade was disbanded in 1977, leaving the reserve parachute battalions as independent units. Following the Falklands War, in November 1983 the 5th Airborne Brigade was formed for out-of-area operations. The brigade consisted of two of the parachute battalions and its own parachute trained artillery, engineers, medics, signals and logistics units. The Options for Change restructuring after the Cold War again reduced the number of TA battalions. The 4th and 15th Battalions were amalgamated in 1993 as the 4th Battalion, and the 10th Battalion was disbanded. The 5th Airborne Brigade lasted until the 1999 Strategic Defence Review, which recommended that the 5th Airborne and 24th Airmobile Brigade be amalgamated as the 16th Air Assault Brigade.

== Operational history ==
=== Second World War ===
==== North Africa ====
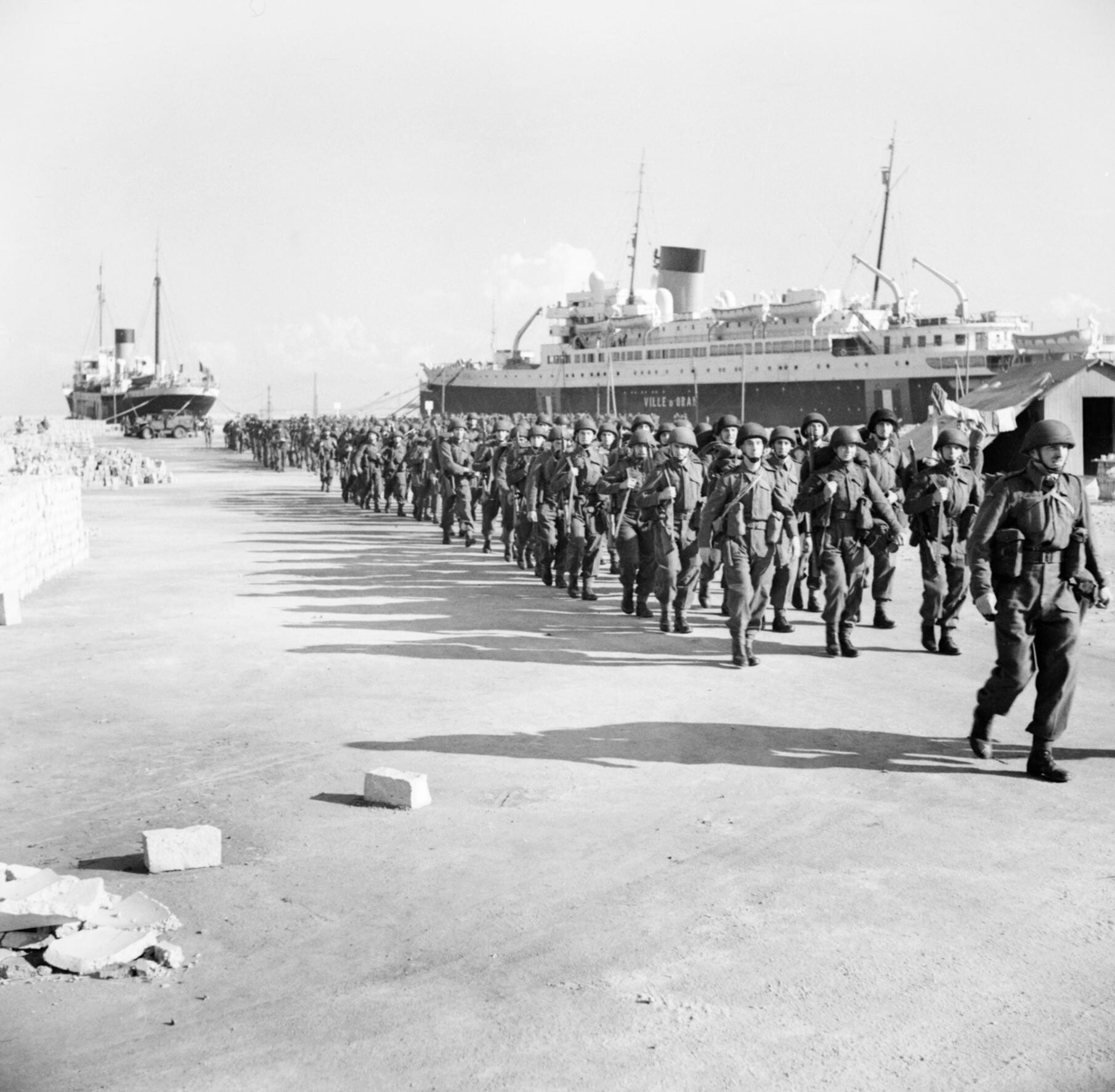
British paratroops march away after landing at Algiers

In November 1942 the British First Army, with the 1st, 2nd and 3rd Parachute Battalions (1st Parachute Brigade) attached, invaded French Morocco and Algeria (Operation Torch). The British airborne operations in North Africa started on 12 November, when the 3rd Battalion carried out the first battalion sized parachute drop, on Bône airfield between Algiers and Tunis. The remainder of the brigade arrived by sea the next day. On 15 November, the 1st Battalion were ordered to parachute and capture a vital road junction at Béja 90 miles (140 km) west of Tunis. The battalion captured both Béja and Mateur after an attack on a German armoured column and an Italian tank position. The 2nd Battalion, now commanded by Lieutenant Colonel John Frost, carried out a parachute drop on Depienne Airfield 30 miles (48 km) south of Tunis. The airfield had been abandoned, so they marched 10 miles (16 km) to capture Oudna Airfield. There, they were supposed to have been relieved by advancing British forces, but they had been held up by unexpected German resistance. Frost contacted First Army, only to be informed that, as they were trapped 50 miles (80 km) behind the lines, they had been written off. The battalion headed for the British lines, but lost 266 men under constant German attack by the time they reached safety at Medjez el Bab.

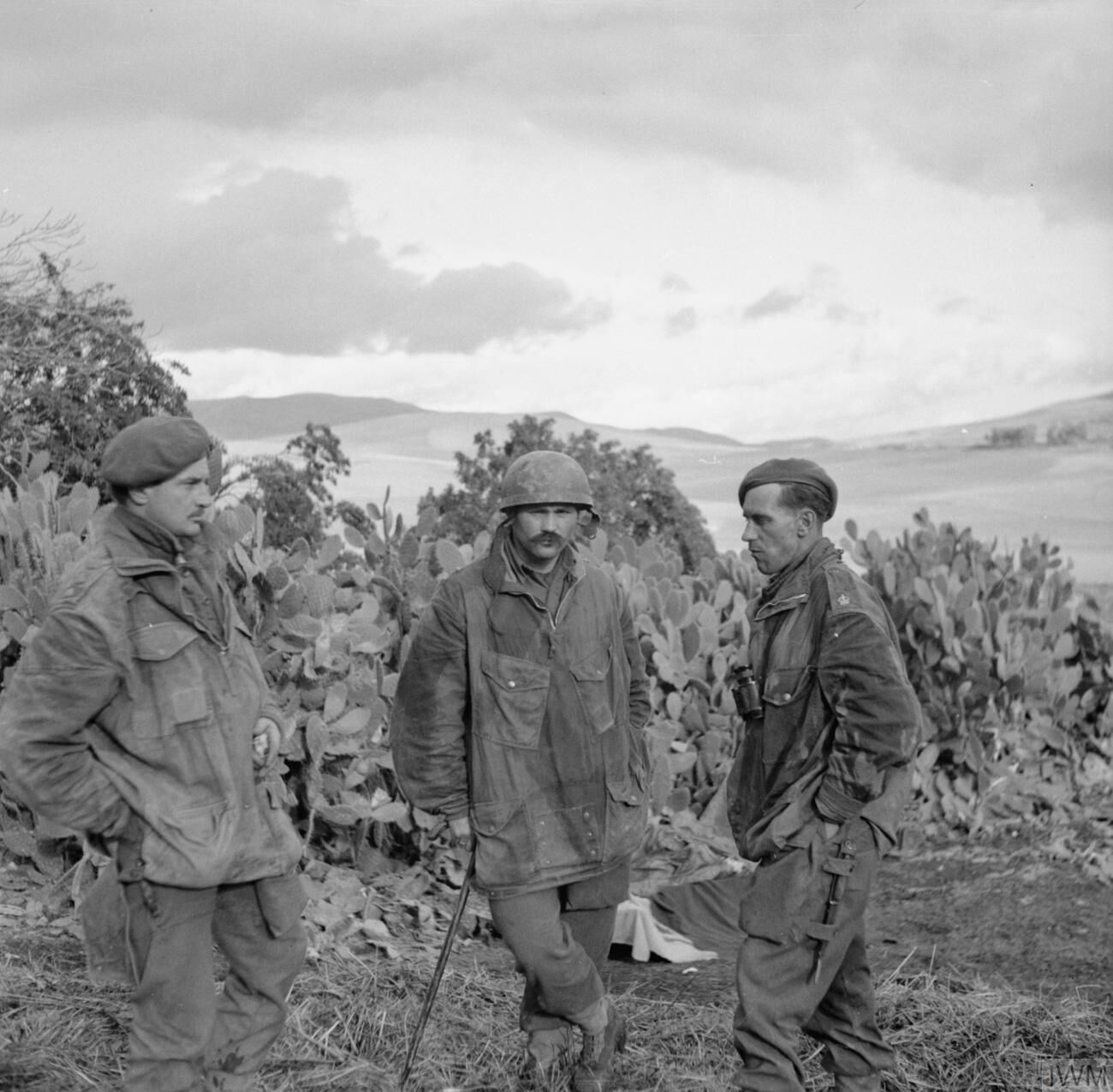
2nd Battalion officers, Tunisia, 26 December 1942

In February 1943, the brigade deployed as normal infantry, serving in the front lines for the rest of the Tunisian Campaign. They fought notable actions at Bou Arada and Tamerza against their German counterparts, the Fallschirmjäger, where they earned the nickname "Die Roten Teufel" (the Red Devils).

==== Sicily ====
The 1st, 2nd and 3rd Battalions (1st Parachute Brigade) next took part in Operation Fustian. This was an airborne assault to seize and hold the Primosole Bridge over the River Simeto, south of Mount Etna on the island of Sicily, and hold until relieved by ground forces. Those that survived the flight landed on the same drop zone (DZ) chosen by the 1st Fallschirmjäger Division, which had landed moments before the British aircraft appeared. The two forces engaged in a bitter fight, and the Paras failed to secure the landing ground for the following glider force of the 1st Airlanding Brigade carrying their artillery and heavy equipment. Those gliders that did land were not unloaded before the bridge was captured at 04:40. Later that day, the Germans counter-attacked with artillery support and, within hours, the Paras were driven off the bridge.

==== Italy ====
In September, the 4th, 5th and 6th Battalions (2nd Parachute Brigade) and the 10th, 11th and 156th Battalions (4th Parachute Brigade) took part in Operation Slapstick, a landing from the sea near the port of Taranto in Italy. Their objective was to capture the port and several nearby airfields, and link up with the British Eighth Army, before pressing north to join the U.S. Fifth Army near Foggia. They landed unopposed on 9 September 1943, the only losses being 58 men of the 6th Battalion, lost at sea when their ship struck a mine. Pushing inland, the Paras captured the town of Castellaneta and the town and airfield of Gioia del Colle before the 4th Parachute Brigade was withdrawn from the theatre.

On 14 September 1943, a company of the 11th Battalion carried out a parachute drop on the island of Kos. The Italian garrison surrendered, and the company was quickly reinforced by men from the 1st Battalion, Durham Light Infantry and Royal Air Force Regiment, before being withdrawn on 25 September and in December 1943, the 11th Battalion rejoined the division in England.

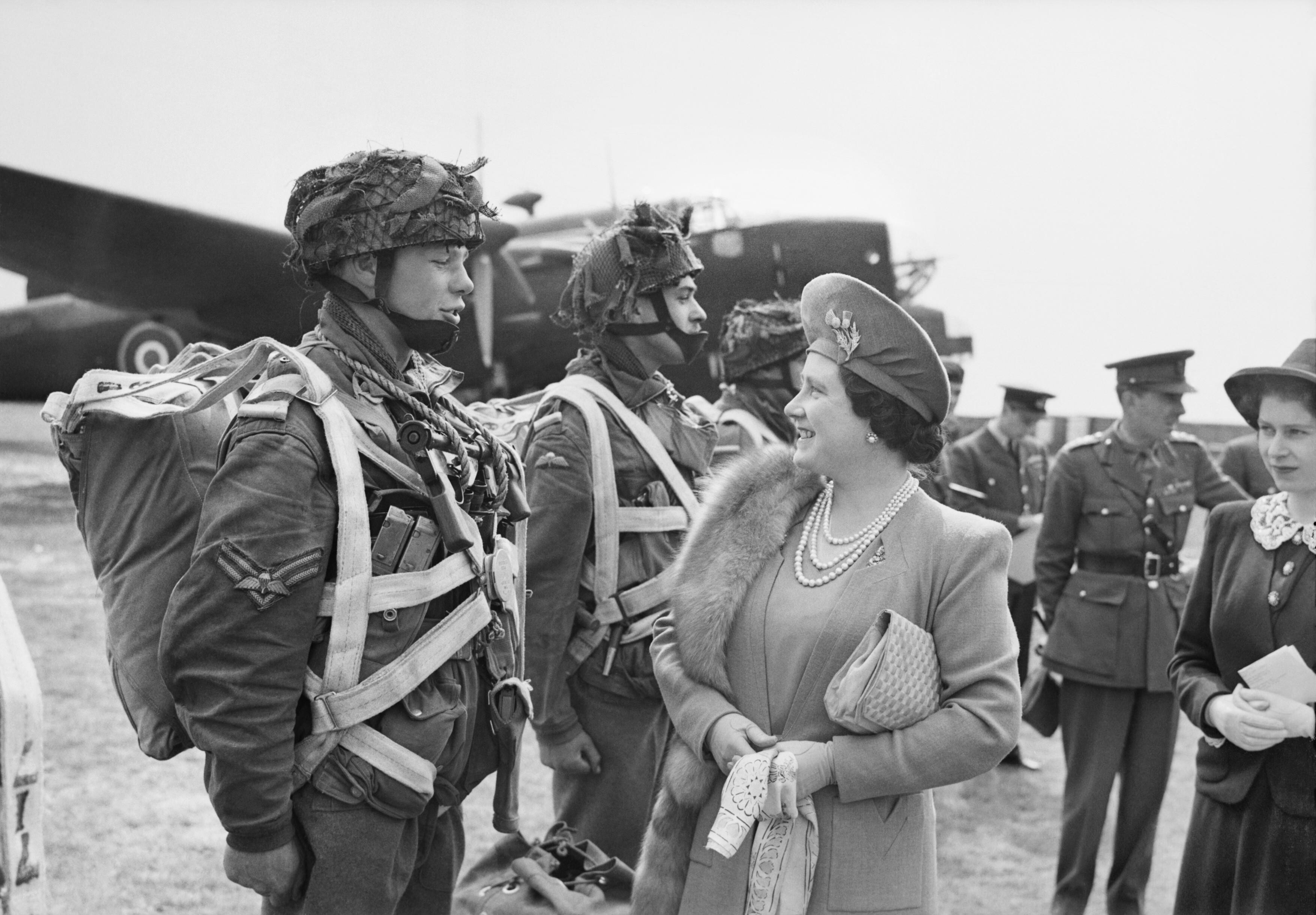
Queen Elizabeth and Princess Elizabeth talking to paratroopers in preparation of D-Day, 19 May 1944

The 2nd Parachute Brigade fought on in Italy under command of several infantry divisions, including the 2nd New Zealand Division and 8th Indian Infantry Division. In June 1944 they carried out Operation Hasty, the only parachute drop on the Italian mainland. This was a 60-man raid ahead of 2nd NZ Division's area intended to disrupt the German demolition plan during the withdrawal from the Gothic Line. 2nd Parachute Brigade took part in Operation Dragoon in southern France, then returned to Italy briefly before being sent to Greece.

==== Normandy ====
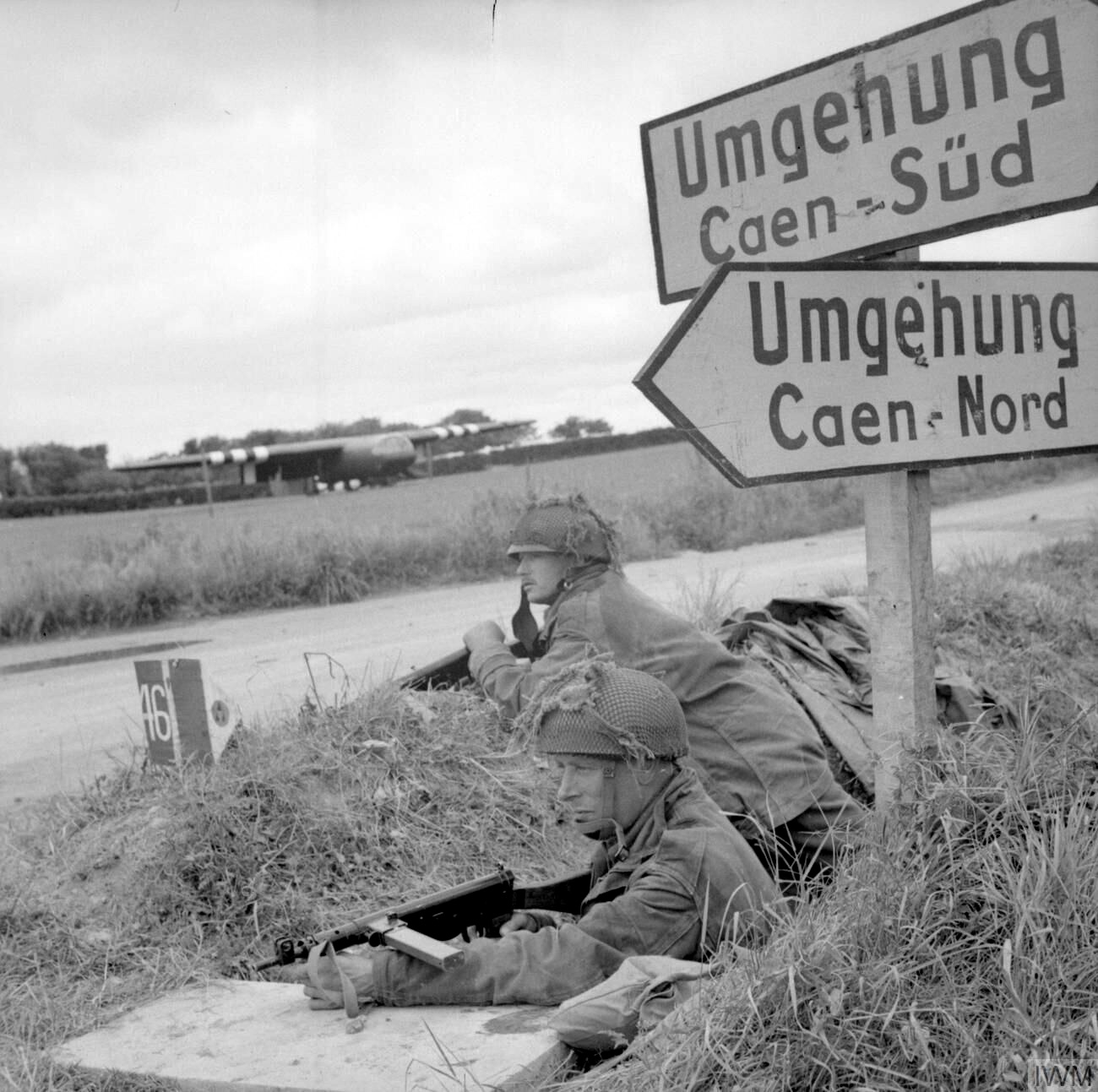
Normandy 7 June 1944, men of the 6th Airborne Division guarding a road junction near Ranville. Each is armed with a Mk V Sten submachine gun

The next operation for the regiment was in Normandy, France with the 6th Airborne Division. The 8th and 9th Battalions, along with the 1st Canadian Parachute Battalion, from the (3rd Parachute Brigade) and the 7th, 12th and 13th Battalions of the (5th Parachute Brigade) were involved. The mission was Operation Tonga, capturing bridges over the River Orne and Caen Canal, and destroying the Merville Gun Battery and several other bridges to prevent the Germans reaching the landing beaches. The 7th Battalion had so many missing that, by 03:00, only around 40 per cent of the battalion had been accounted for. They did, however, manage to reinforce the glider troops of 2nd Battalion, Oxford and Bucks Light Infantry, from the 6th Airlanding Brigade, that had captured the Caen canal and Orne river bridges and held them until relieved by the 3rd Infantry Division. The 12th and 13th Battalions also had about 40 per cent of their men go missing. The 12th had to capture the village of Le Bas de Ranville, whilst the 13th was to take the town of Ranville. Both battalions then helped secure the area around the captured bridges until relieved. Only about 150 men of the 9th Battalion had assembled when they launched their assault on the Merville Gun Battery. Their attack on the battery was successful, but with heavy casualties: 50 dead and 25 wounded. The 8th Battalion had to destroy two bridges near Bures and a third by Troarn. All bridges were destroyed and the battalion numbering around 190 men dug in around Troarn. The paras held the left flank of the invasion area until going onto the offensive on the night of 16/17 August. In nine days, they advanced to the mouth of the River Seine, capturing over 1,000 German prisoners. On 27 August, the division was withdrawn from the front line and embarked for England in September. The division's casualties were 821 killed, 2,709 wounded and 927 missing.

==== South of France ====
The 4th, 5th and 6th Parachute Battalions (2nd Independent Parachute Brigade) had been left in Italy when the 1st Airborne Division returned to England. On 15 August 1944, the 1st Airborne Task Force (ATF), including the 2nd Independent Parachute Brigade, parachuted into the region between Fréjus and Cannes in the south of France. Their objective was to destroy all enemy positions in the area and hold until the U.S. Seventh Army came ashore. The ATF was preceded at 03:30 by nine pathfinder teams; only three teams, all from the 2nd Independent Parachute Brigade, landed on the correct DZs. When the brigade starting landing on 04:50, the drop was dispersed. Most of the 6th Battalion, half of the 4th, and one company of the 5th landed on their DZs. Most of the rest of the Paras were scattered over a 9-mile (14 km) area, but some landed 20 miles (32 km) away at Cannes. The battalions achieved all their objectives apart from the town of Le Muy on the first day. The brigade remained in France until 26 August and then returned to Italy.

==== Arnhem ====
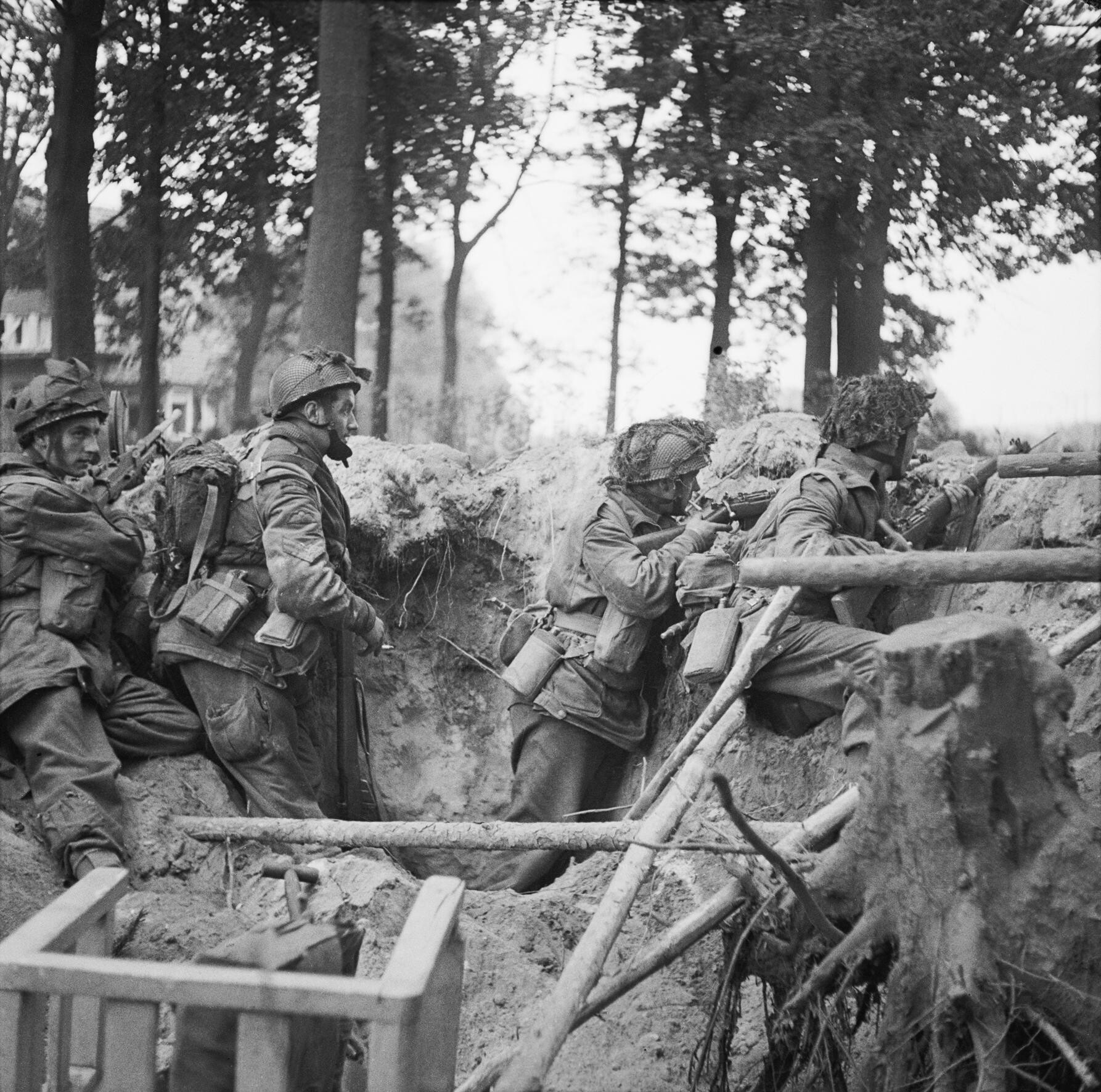
Men of the 1st Battalion, day one, 17 September 1944

The 1st, 2nd and 3rd Battalions (1st Parachute Brigade) and the 10th, 11th and 156th Battalions (4th Parachute Brigade) were next in action in Operation Market Garden in the Netherlands with the 1st Airborne Division. The resulting Battle of Arnhem has since become a byword for the fighting spirit of British paratroops and set a standard for the Parachute Regiment. The division's mission was to capture intact the road, rail and pontoon bridges over the Lower Rhine at Arnhem and hold them until relieved, which was expected to occur two or three days later. A shortage of transport aircraft hindered operations, and it would take two days for all three of the division's brigades to arrive. It was decided that the 1st Parachute and the airlanding brigade would land on the first day. The DZs and LZs would be secured by the airlanding brigade, whilst the 1st, 2nd and 3rd Parachute battalions would head into Arnhem and capture the bridges. On the second day, the 4th Parachute Brigade would arrive. These battalions would dig in north and north-west of Arnhem. On day one 17 September 1944, the 1st Parachute Brigade landed and headed towards Arnhem, but only the 2nd Battalion, largely unopposed, made it to the bridges. The railway bridge was blown up as they approached and the pontoon bridge was missing a section. By dusk, most of the 2nd Battalion and some supporting units, including the Brigade Headquarters, numbering about 740 men, had taken the northern end of the Arnhem road bridge. By the second day, the 9th SS Panzer Division arrived in Arnhem, deploying to the west of the city and cutting off access to the bridge.

On day two attempts by the 1st and 3rd Battalions to fight through to the bridge were unsuccessful and, by 10:00, they had been halted. At the bridge, the 2nd Battalion continued to hold out against German armoured and infantry attacks. Several hours later than expected, at 15:00, the 4th Parachute Brigade landed under fire from the Germans. The 11th Battalion was sent towards Arnhem to assist in the attempt to break through to the bridge, linking up with the 1st and 3rd Battalions after dark. The 10th and 156th Battalions moved to take up their planned positions north-west of Arnhem. En route, in the dark, the 156th Battalion came under fire and halted for the night.

In the morning of the third day, the 1st, 3rd, and 11th Battalions and the 2nd Battalion, South Staffords (1st Airlanding Brigade) tried to fight through to the bridge. Crossing open ground, the 1st Battalion was engaged by heavy fire from three sides. Trapped in the open, the 1st Battalion was decimated, and the 3rd had to withdraw. The 11th, which until then had not been heavily involved, were now exposed by the withdrawal and overwhelmed. Unable to break through the German line, the remaining men retreated towards the main force, now at Oosterbeek. In the north, the 10th and 156th Battalions were spotted as they attempted to seize the high ground in the woods north of Oosterbeek. Both battalions came under German fire and were unable to advance any further. Ordered to fall back on Wolfheze and Oosterbeek, they had to fight all the way, with the Germans in close pursuit. At the bridge, the 2nd Battalion still held out, but short of supplies, their position was becoming untenable. The Germans, had started destroying the buildings the battalion occupied with tank, artillery and mortar fire.

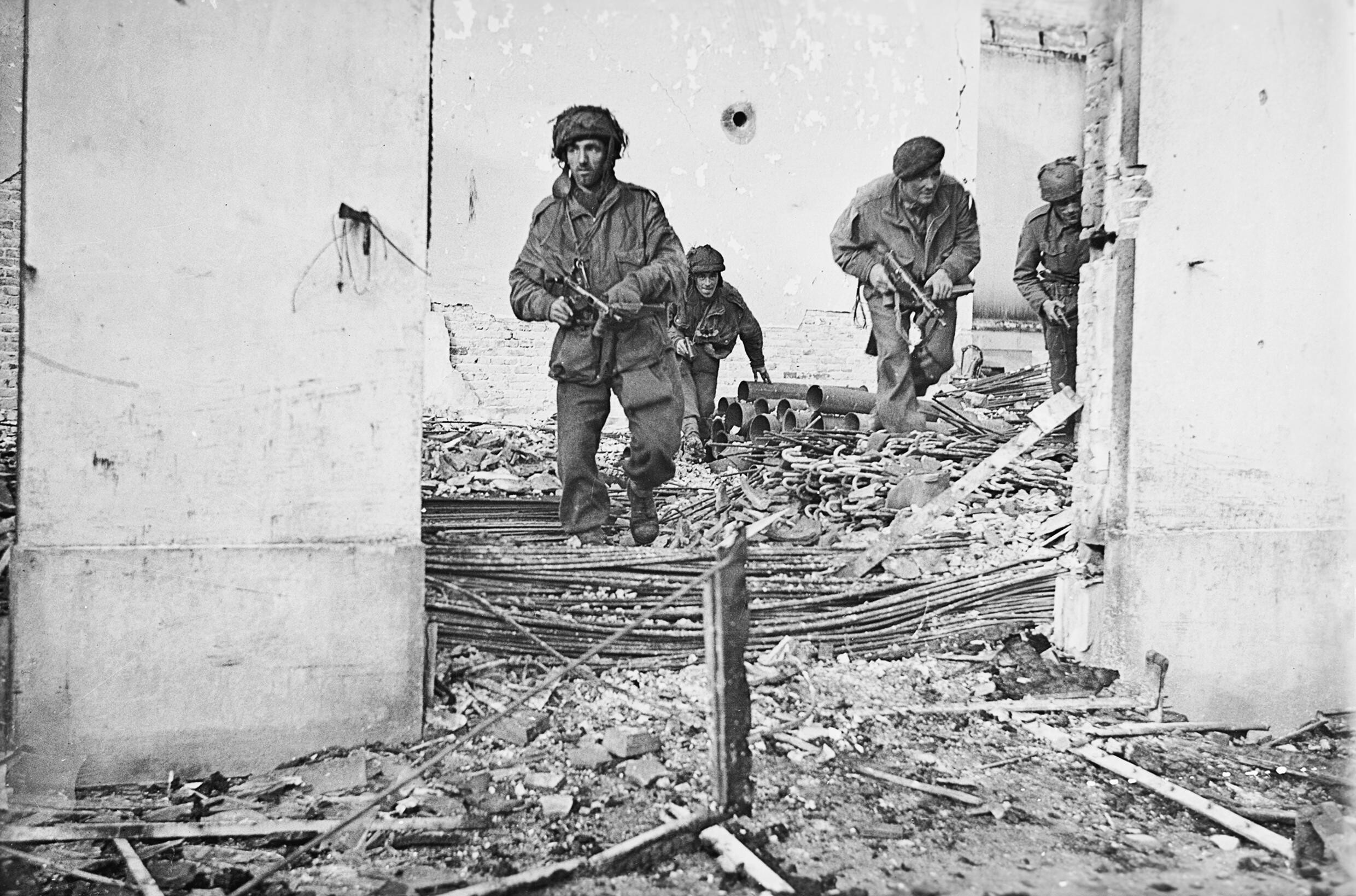
British paratroopers in Oosterbeek, September 1944

By day four, the battered division was too weak to make any attempt to reach the bridge. Of the nine infantry battalions, only the 1st Battalion, Border Regiment, still existed as a unit; the others were just remnants and battalions in name only. The division, unable to do anything for the 2nd Battalion at the bridge, dug in, forming a defensive perimeter around Oosterbeek with its base on the river. The remnants of the 10th and 156th battalions at Wolfheze began to fall back, but several elements were surrounded and captured. Some 150 men of 156th Battalion were pinned down just west of the Oosterbeek. These men broke out in the late afternoon, with 90 of them making it into the perimeter. At the bridge, Lieutenant Colonel Frost finally made radio contact with the division and was told that reinforcement was doubtful. Shortly afterwards, Frost was injured by a mortar bomb, and command passed to Major Frederick Gough. Gough arranged a two-hour truce to evacuate his wounded (including Frost), who were taken into captivity. That night, some units managed to hold out for a while and several tried to break out towards Oosterbeek, but by 05:00 on day five, all resistance at the bridge had ceased.

The division managed to hold on for nine days, until it was decided to withdraw back across the Rhine by rafts and boats. At 10:00 on the last day, the Germans launched an assault with infantry and tanks on the south-east portion of the perimeter. The assault penetrated the perimeter and threatened to cut off the division from the river. British counter-attacks, supported by artillery fire from south of the river, stopped the German assault. To prevent the Germans learning about the evacuation, the plan was kept secret until the afternoon, and some men (mainly wounded) remained behind to give covering fire through the night. By 05:00, 2,163 men had been rescued and the evacuation was ended.

The two parachute brigades had contained 3,082 men of the Parachute Regiment. Of these, 2,656 were killed or reported missing and only 426 made it to safety. The only awards of the Victoria Cross to the Parachute Regiment in the war were for the Battle of Arnhem. The two recipients were Captain John Hollington Grayburn of the 2nd Battalion, and Captain Lionel Ernest Queripel of the 10th Battalion; both awards were posthumous.

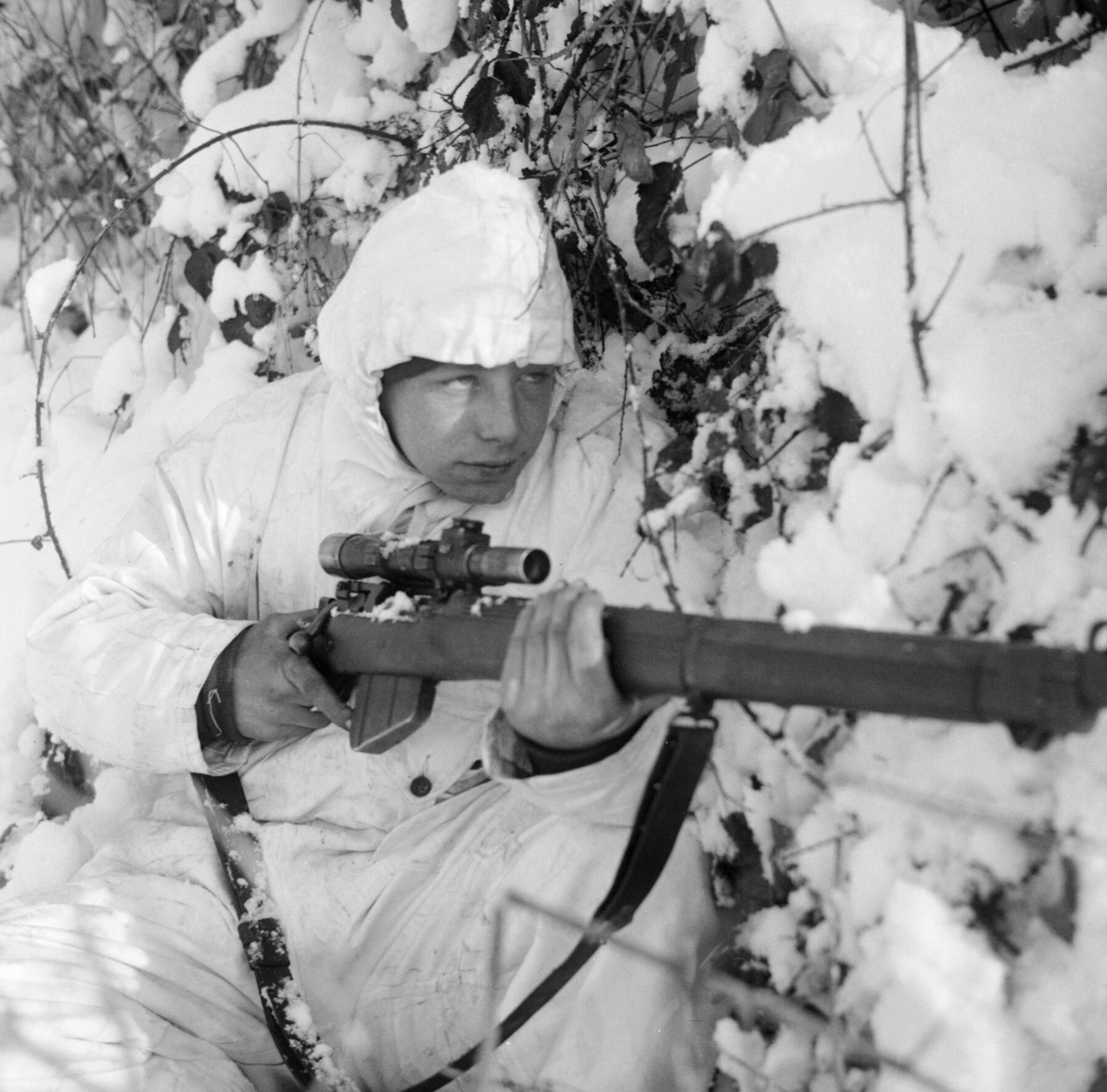
Sniper from the 6th Airborne Division, Ardennes, 14 January 1945

==== Ardennes ====
On 16 December 1944, the German Army launched a surprise offensive against the U.S. First Army through the Ardennes the Battle of the Bulge. The 6th Airborne Division, refitting in England, was flown to Belgium on 22 December to help stop the German attack. By 26 December, the division was in the Dinant and Namur area. On 29 December, they received orders to launch a counter-attack on the leading German units. The 13th Battalion, part of the 5th Parachute Brigade, suffered the heaviest losses. Between 3–5 January, the battalion fought to capture the village of Bure. After they had taken the village, the battalion had to fight off a number of counter-attacks. By the end of the battle, their casualties were 68 dead and 121 wounded or missing.

==== Rhine crossing ====
The airborne assault over the Rhine (Operation Varsity), was the largest single airborne operation in the history of airborne warfare and also involved the U.S. 17th Airborne Division. Five battalions of the Parachute Regiment in the 6th Airborne Division took part. The first unit to land was the 3rd Parachute Brigade (8th, 9th and 1st Canadian Battalions). The brigade suffered a number of casualties as it engaged the German forces in the Diersfordter Wald, but by 11:00, the DZ was almost cleared of German forces. The key town of Schnappenberg was captured by the 9th Battalion in conjunction with the 1st Canadian Battalion. Despite taking casualties, the brigade cleared the area of German forces, and by 13:45, the brigade reported it had secured all of its objectives.

The next unit to land was the 5th Parachute Brigade (7th, 12th and 13th Battalions). The poor visibility around the DZ made it difficult for the Paras to rally. The DZ came under heavy fire from German troops stationed nearby and was subjected to shellfire and mortaring which inflicted casualties in the battalion rendezvous areas. However, the 7th Battalion soon cleared the DZ of German troops, many of whom were situated in farms and houses, and the 12th and 13th secured the rest of the brigade's objectives. The brigade was then ordered to move due east and clear an area near Schnappenberg, as well as to engage German forces gathered to the west of the farmhouse where the 6th Airborne Division Headquarters was established. By 15:30, the brigade had secured all of its objectives and linked up with other British airborne units.

By nightfall of 24 March, out of the 7,220 men of the 6th Airborne Division who had taken part in the operation, 1,400 men had been reported killed, wounded or missing.

=== Post war operations ===
==== Far East ====
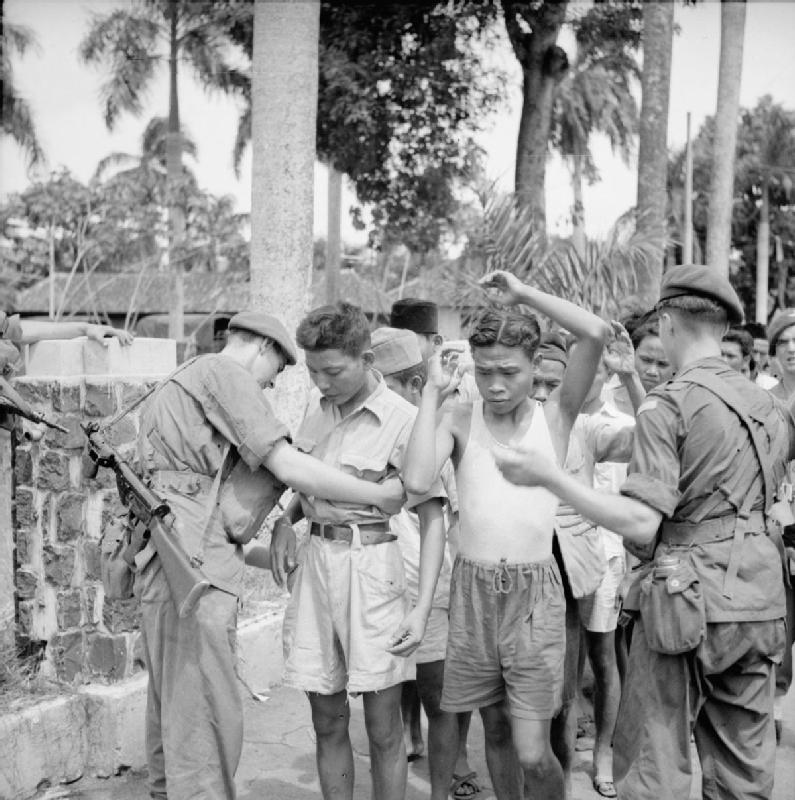
Men of the 12th Battalion, search suspects in Batavia (Jakarta) December 1945

In May 1945, it was intended that the 6th Airborne Division should be deployed to the Far East. It was intended they would form an Airborne Corps with the 44th Indian Airborne Division. The first unit to leave was the 5th Parachute Brigade, under the command of Kenneth Darling. The brigade consisted of the 7th, 12th and 13th Battalions, 22nd Independent Parachute Company, and support units. The brigade arrived in India in June 1945 and started jungle training, but Japan surrendered before it was completed. The Japanese surrender changed British plans and it was decided the 6th Airborne Division would become the Imperial Strategic Reserve and stay in Europe. The brigade was used on operations in Malaya, and Singapore restoring order after the Japanese occupation.

In December, the brigade was part of Operation Pounce, a mission to disarm the remaining Japanese forces in Java until they could be relieved by Dutch forces in April 1946. On their arrival in Batavia (Jakarta) they discovered that the Japanese had handed over their weapons to Indonesian nationalists who attacked the British force when they tried to wrest control, knowing that the British intended to return Batavia to the Dutch. The brigade dispersed rioters and patrolled the city until they were moved to Semarang on the coast between Batavia and Surabaya in January 1946. To prevent nationalists entering the town, the three battalions established patrols on the outskirts of the town and seized the docks and the airport. Despite a number of guerrilla attacks, the Indonesians were defeated. In April 1946, the British handed over control to the Dutch and returned to Singapore.

==== Palestine ====
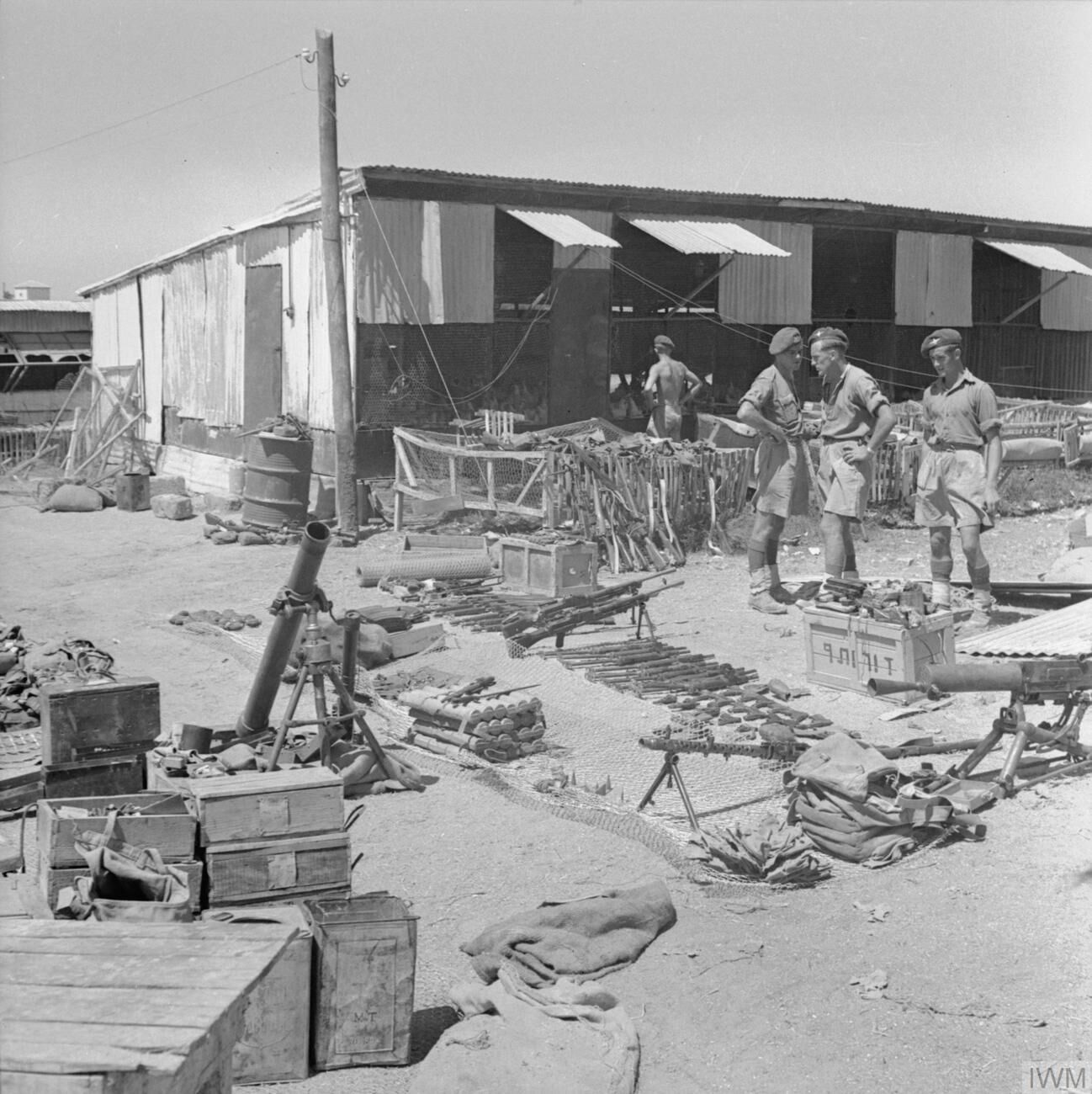
Weapons, ammunition, and equipment discovered at the Jewish settlement near Gaza by the Parachute Regiment in September 1946

As the Imperial reserve, the 6th Airborne Division was sent to Palestine in September 1945 as the Jewish insurgency in Mandatory Palestine intensified. The division now consisted of the 2nd Parachute Brigade (4th, 5th and 6th Battalions), 3rd Parachute Brigade (3rd, 8th and 9th Battalions) and 6th Airlanding Brigade. Their mission was to support the police in keeping the peace between the Arab and Jewish populations. In November, the 3rd Parachute Brigade had to intervene during Arab-Jewish riots in Jerusalem and Tel Aviv that had persisted for a number of days. The division also conducted a 48-hour search of Tel Aviv called Operation Shark in response to the King David Hotel bombing. While in Palestine, the division was subjected to numerous attacks by Jewish fighters; in one such on 25 April 1947, Lehi killed seven men of the 5th Battalion.

Palestine was a time of change for the Paras. With the reduction in the army after the war, the 1st Airborne Division had been disbanded and the 1st Parachute Brigade (1st, 2nd and 17th Battalions) joined the 6th Division on 1 April 1946 to replace the 6th Airlanding Brigade. In August, the 5th Parachute Brigade (7th, 12th and 13th Battalions) rejoined the division from the Far East, but was soon disbanded and its men reassigned to the other battalions in the division. Further reductions saw the disbandment of the 3rd Parachute Brigade in October 1947, leaving just the 1st and 2nd Brigades in the division. On 18 February 1948, news that the division was to be disbanded was received, leaving only one regular army parachute brigade, the 2nd, soon renumbered the 16th Parachute Brigade.

==== 1950s Cyprus and Suez ====
3rd Battalion landing at El Gamil Airfield, Port Said, Suez 1956. The last British battalion sized parachute operation

For most of the next 20 years, the Parachute Regiment was involved in numerous peacekeeping and small scale operations associated with the withdrawal from empire. In 1951, the Prime Minister of Iran, Mohammad Mosaddegh, seized the oilfields in Abadan. The 16th Parachute Brigade was sent out to Cyprus in June to be ready to intervene should it be required. They were soon sent to reinforce the British troops in the Suez Canal Zone in response to Egyptian nationalists threatening the bases there. The brigade returned to Cyprus between January and July 1956 because of attacks on British forces by EOKA insurgents.

On 5 November 1956, the 3rd Battalion conducted what would become the last British battalion-sized parachute assault. The objective was the El Gamil airfield in Port Said during the Suez Crisis. The battalion secured the airfield and dug in to wait the arrival of the rest of the assault forces by sea. The 1st and 2nd Battalions arrived at Port Said by Landing Ship Tank, the 2nd Battalion were delayed in starting to advance towards Ismailia. The battalion was supported by the tanks of the 6th Royal Tank Regiment, but due to the delay, they were still short of their objective when a ceasefire was announced. On 14 November, the brigade returned to Cyprus.

==== 1960s Kuwait, Aden and Malaysia ====
In a statement on 25 June 1961, President Abd al-Karim Qasim of Iraq claimed that Kuwait was part of his country and announced his intention to annex it. On the strength of a formal defence commitment between the two countries, Kuwait appealed for help from Britain. A force was assembled (Operation Vantage) which included armour, artillery, commando, and infantry battalions, one being the 2nd Battalion, based in Cyprus. The battalion was not involved in any combat and remained just long enough for the Arab League to take over from them. All British forces had withdrawn by 19 October.

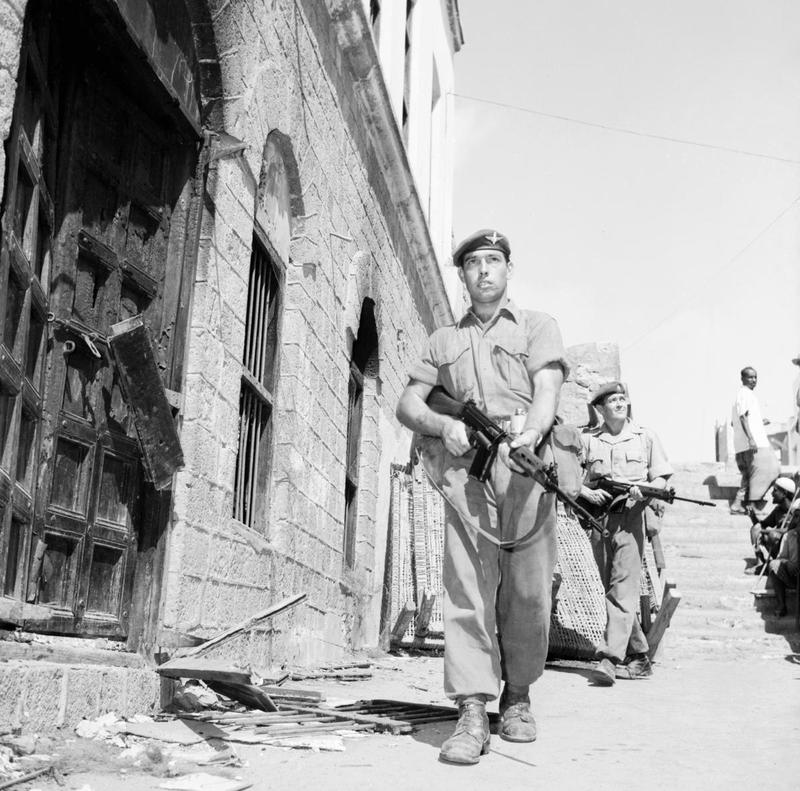
Foot patrol by the 1st Battalion in Aden, 1956

In 1960, Britain decided to withdraw from Aden, which was then part of the Federation of South Arabia, with independence scheduled for 1968. This decision started a campaign by the local tribes against the regular army. Supported by Egypt, communist infiltration reached a head in 1963 when Britain was forced to take action in support of the local government in what was called the Aden Emergency. The British force, known as Radforce, comprised a mixture of troops including a company from the 3rd Battalion. The rest of the 3rd Battalion, under the command of Lieutenant-Colonel Anthony Farrar-Hockley, was also sent to Aden to conduct operations in the Radfan mountains, capturing the Bkri ridge in May 1964. Farrar-Hockley was awarded the bar for his Distinguished Service Order (DSO) for this operation. The rest of the battalion were awarded two Military Crosses (MC) and one Military Medal (MM), and a number were mentioned in dispatches. By 1964, the terrorist attacks had spread to Aden, south of Radfan; to protect British servicemen and their dependents, the 1st Battalion was deployed on security duties throughout the areas of Crater and Khormasker. In January 1967, the 1st Battalion returned to Aden on an emergency tour to cover the final withdrawal of British troops from the region. For a series of actions in June in the Sheik Othman and Al Mansura districts of Aden, the battalion's commanding officer, Lieutenant-Colonel Michael J. H. Walsh, was awarded the DSO. The rest of the battalion were awarded three MCs and one MM, and a number were mentioned in dispatches.

In 1965, the 2nd Battalion, Parachute Regiment, was sent to Singapore for jungle training in response to the threat of invasion from Indonesian President Sukarno. By March, the battalion was established along the Malaysia–Indonesia border in Borneo and conducting 10-day patrols in the jungle. On 27 April, 'B' Company's base on the hilltop village of Plaman Mapu, consisting of company headquarters, a mortar section, and one weak platoon of young soldiers, was attacked by 150 Indonesians supported by rocket launchers, mortars, rifle grenades, and machine guns from the surrounding hills. The accurate fire caused several casualties amongst the defenders. The Company Sergeant Major (CSM), John Williams, was in command of the defence. He kept moving around the base, attending to the wounded, reorganising the defenders to counter each attack, and firing illumination rounds from a 2-inch mortar. The Indonesians penetrated the wire, taking out a mortar position. CSM Williams crossed the open ground under fire to man a machine gun, which he used to engage the Indonesians inside the perimeter. Covered by the machine gun, the Paras counter-attacked and forced the Indonesians back. The Indonesians had located CSM Williams's machine gun, and in a second attack, it was subjected to heavy fire at point-blank range. Wounded and blinded in one eye, CSM Williams returned fire, defeating the second attack. He then led a fighting patrol to attack two groups of Indonesians seen approaching the base.

For the successful defence of the base, CSM Williams was awarded the Distinguished Conduct Medal (DCM); in the same action, Corporal Malcolm Baughan was awarded the Military Medal (MM).

==== 1970s Northern Ireland ====
Officer of the 1st Battalion Belfast December 1969

The British Army during Operation Banner spent 38 years in Northern Ireland, during which the 2nd Battalion spent more time there than any other infantry battalion. Between 1971 and 1996, 51 men of the Parachute Regiment were killed while serving in Northern Ireland.

The first was Sergeant Michael Willetts, 3rd Battalion. On 24 May 1971, he was killed during a bombing incident at the Springfield Road Police Station in Belfast. A hand-carried bomb in a suitcase was left at the front of the station. Sergeant Willetts held open a door allowing members of the public and police officers to escape and then stood in the doorway, shielding those taking cover. For his actions, he was awarded the George Cross.

===== Ballymurphy massacre =====
Following Operation Demetrius (the mass arrest and internment of Irish nationalists), soldiers of the Parachute Regiment were involved in the Ballymurphy massacre, in which 11 innocent civilians were shot dead and dozens wounded between 9 and 11 August 1971. At the Ballymurphy inquest in 2019, Sir Geoffrey Howlett, who in 1971 was a lieutenant colonel and commander of the Parachute Regiment's Second Battalion, gave evidence in which he acknowledged that "most, if not all" of those killed were not members of the IRA, and that a regimental note from 1971 indicating that the incident inflicted "severe casualties" on the IRA may have been a mistake. Howlett added that he had "enormous sympathy" toward the families of those killed.

===== Bloody Sunday =====
In what has become known as "Bloody Sunday", the 1st Battalion were sent to Derry on 30 January 1972 to help to police a civil rights march demanding an end to internment. The Paras shot dead 13 unarmed civilians and wounded another 17 (one of whom later died of his wounds).

The first inquiry into the Bloody Sunday events, produced by Lord Widgery in April 1972, largely cleared the Paras of blame. It denoted some of their shooting as "bordering on the reckless" but mostly accepted their claims that they shot at gunmen and bomb-throwers. As a result of the subsequent and more detailed Saville report, even observers who are natural supporters of the British Army are assessed as regarding the Widgery findings as "discredited."

A more detailed inquiry—chaired by Lord Saville (Bloody Sunday Inquiry) and lasting over a decade—concluded that the Paras had fired on unarmed civilians, most of whom were shot while fleeing or trying to help the wounded. It found that none of the march participants were posing a serious threat, that no bombs were thrown, and that soldiers "knowingly put forward false accounts" to justify their firing.

The soldiers denied shooting the victims named or anyone else by mistake. The inquiry found that soldiers had been fired at by members of the "Official IRA" but concluded that the Paras had fired the first shots and that none of the soldiers had fired in response to attacks or to threatened attacks by gunmen or bomb-throwers, although two soldiers suffered slight injuries from acid or a similar, corrosive substance. This inquiry identified failures of leadership and command by the commanding officer, and failures by individual soldiers involved.

Representatives of the soldiers involved criticised the report as "one-sided". Prime Minister David Cameron, addressing the House of Commons in 2010 after the publication of the report, stated that the Paras' action overall was "both unjustified and unjustifiable, it was wrong".

The 1972 Aldershot bombing was carried out by the "Official IRA" as a revenge attack for Bloody Sunday. On 22 February 1972, a car bomb was left outside the officers' mess of the 16th Parachute Brigade in Aldershot. When the bomb exploded, a Roman Catholic priest serving in the army and five female kitchen staff were killed while 19 others were injured.

===== Shankill Road shootings =====
The 1st Battalion was involved in another controversial shooting incident on 7 September 1972. The Paras raided houses and the headquarters of the Ulster Defence Association (UDA) in the Protestant Shankill area of Belfast. Two Protestant civilians were shot dead and others wounded by the Paras, who claimed they were returning fire at loyalist gunmen. This sparked angry demonstrations by local Protestants, and a unit of the Army's Ulster Defence Regiment (UDR) refused to carry out duties until 1 Para was withdrawn from the Shankill.

===== Warrenpoint ambush =====
On 27 August 1979, 16 men of the 2nd Battalion, Parachute Regiment, and two from the Queen's Own Highlanders (QOH) were killed in the Warrenpoint ambush. The first six Paras were killed while travelling in a small convoy of three vehicles. As it passed a roadside bomb hidden in a lorry by the Provisional Irish Republican Army (PIRA), the bomb exploded. The PIRA had studied how the Army reacted after a bombing and correctly guessed that they would set up an incident command point in the nearby gatehouse. A second bomb detonated 32 minutes later, killing 10 Paras and two men from the QOH, one being Lieutenant-Colonel David Blair, their commanding officer. After the first explosion, the soldiers, believing that they had come under attack from the IRA, began firing across the narrow maritime border with the Republic of Ireland, a distance of only 57 m (187 feet). An uninvolved civilian, Michael Hudson (an Englishman whose father was a coachman at Buckingham Palace) was killed as a result, and his cousin Barry Hudson wounded. According to RUC researchers, the soldiers may have mistaken the sound of ammunition cooking off from the destroyed Land Rover for enemy gunfire from across the border. The Paras were under orders not to pursue their attackers into the Republic to avoid causing any diplomatic incidents. The death toll in the Warrenpoint ambush is the highest suffered by the British Army in a single incident in Northern Ireland.

==== Falklands War ====
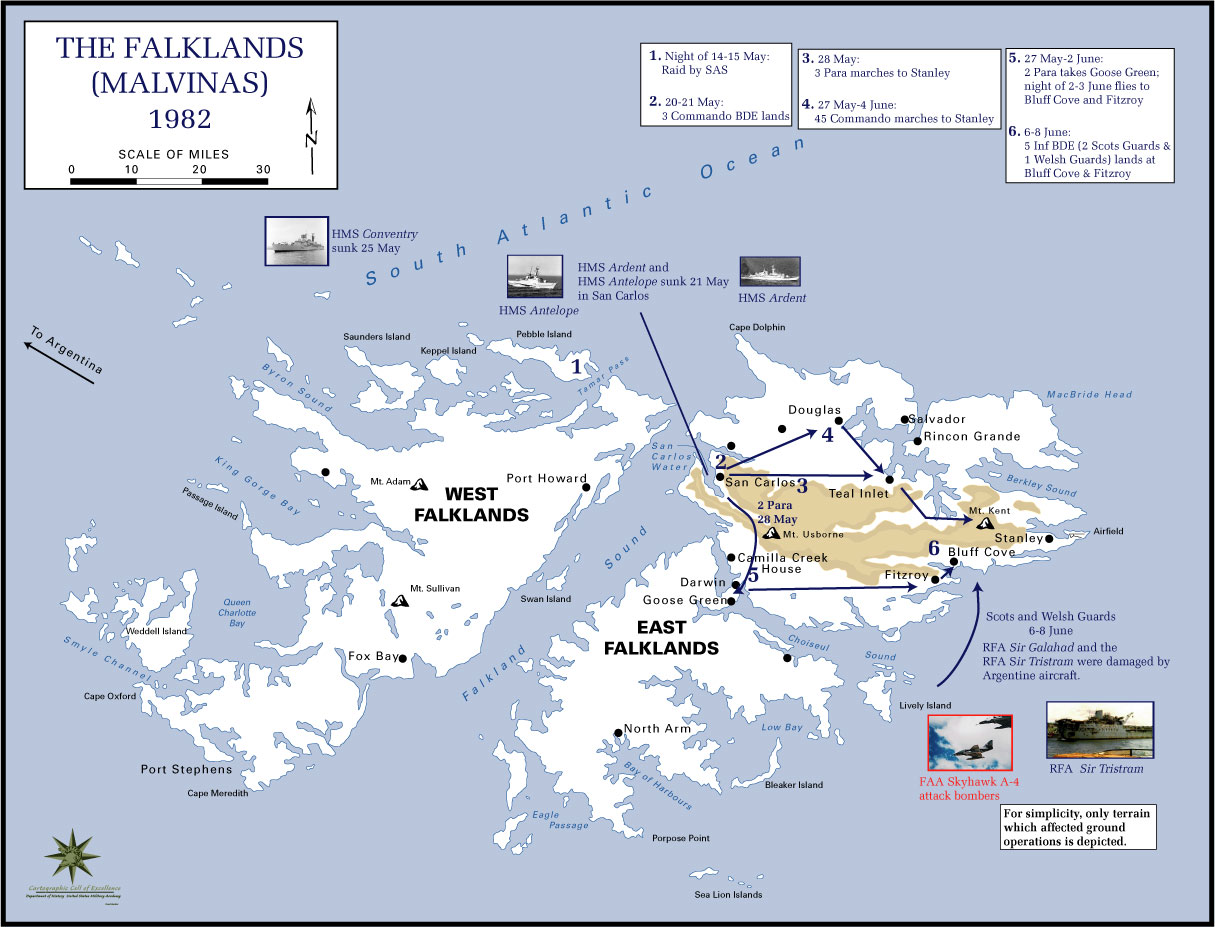
Falklands campaign 1982

On 2 April 1982, the Falklands War began when Argentine forces began the invasion of the British Overseas Territories of the Falkland Islands and South Georgia. British Prime Minister Margaret Thatcher announced on 3 April that a naval task force was being sent to the South Atlantic to "restore British administration to the Falkland Islands". On 20 April, the British war cabinet ordered the repossession of the Falkland Islands and South Georgia. The force dispatched to carry this out was based on the 3 Commando Brigade, reinforced by the 2nd and 3rd Battalions, Parachute Regiment. At 04:40 21 May, the 2nd Battalion was the first major unit to land in the Falklands, just south of San Carlos on the eastern side of San Carlos Water. They immediately moved south to the Sussex Mountains to cover the landings. By daylight, all troops had landed with little opposition.

The first battle in the campaign was the Battle of Goose Green, undertaken by the 2nd Battalion on 28 May. After a day long battle the Argentine commanders, agreed to surrender at 09:30 29 May. The battle had cost the battalion 15 dead and 37 wounded. The Argentines had lost 55 dead, about 100 wounded and 1,500 were taken prisoner. Lieutenant-Colonel H. Jones was later awarded a posthumous Victoria Cross; amongst other awards were one DSO, and two DCMs.

Over the night 11/12 June, the 3rd Battalion fought the Battle of Mount Longdon. Longdon is a prominent feature to the north-west of the island's capital, Port Stanley, which dominates the surrounding area. During the battle Sergeant Ian McKay, was killed in a single handed attack on a machine gun position. For his actions, he was awarded a posthumous Victoria Cross, the second of only two such awards during the war. Other members of the battalion received a DSO, two DCMs.

The last battle of the war was the Battle of Wireless Ridge by the 2nd Battalion. The ridge was taken with minimal casualties and an Argentine counter-attack defeated. The Argentines now had their backs to the sea, and only the capital, Stanley, remained to be liberated. Later that day, 14 June 1982, General Menéndez surrendered all Argentine forces. The cost to the two battalions was 40 dead and 93 wounded, the highest death toll of any British regiment on land in that conflict.

==== Balkans ====
In May 1999, the British government decided to send a force of 17,400 troops to take part in operations in Kosovo, saying that the troops would be needed to rebuild the infrastructure after the Kosovo War. An additional 12,000 troops joined the force of 5,400 already stationed in the Republic of Macedonia. On 6 June, the 5th Airborne Brigade, including the 1st Battalion and other units, were flown to Macedonia. On 12 June, the brigade spearheaded Operation Joint Guardian the advance into Kosovo by KFOR. The 1st Battalion and other brigade units secured the high ground above the road from Bace to Pristina. With the road covered, NATO forces could start their advance into the country.

On 12 June, British paratroopers and other NATO forces had a tense standoff against Russian paratroopers over the Russian occupation of the Pristina Airport. The incident was peacefully resolved.

On 24 June, the 1st Battalion Battle Group assumed control of Pristina, the capital of Kosovo. On that first day, they had to deal with murder, kidnapping, torture, inter-communal gun-battles, house burnings, beatings, weapon finds and looting. The number of incidents reported required all the battalion's subunits. By the afternoon, there were no reserves left. To relieve the problem, an ad hoc patrol of headquarters staff, including the padre, was formed to assist.

In August 2001, the 2nd Battalion took part in NATO's intervention in the Republic of Macedonia (Operation Essential Harvest) to disarm the rebel National Liberation Army, with the mission planned to last 30 days.

==== Sierra Leone ====
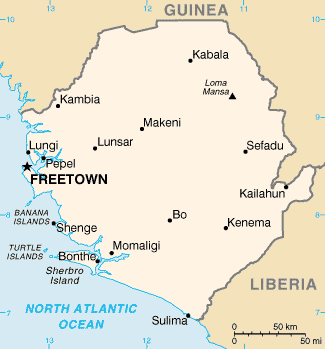
Sierra Leone

In May 2000, Operation Palliser was the name given to the evacuation of British, Commonwealth and European Union citizens from Sierra Leone. At the time, rebel activity was increasing and the capital city Freetown was in danger. A task force including the 1st Battalion, less 'A' Company but reinforced by 'D' Company, 2nd Battalion, and the Pathfinder Platoon, elements of the Special Air Service (SAS), the Royal Navy and the Royal Air Force were dispatched to the country.

A forward operating base at Lungi Airport, to be used in the evacuation, was seized by 'C' Company, 1st Battalion, arriving by C-130 Hercules.

On 17 May, the Pathfinder Platoon in the village of Lungi Lol, 12 miles (19 km) from the airport, were attacked by the rebels. The fight lasted several hours, killing over 30 rebels without loss to the Pathfinders. At the end of May, the Parachute Regiment was relieved by 42 Commando and returned to the United Kingdom.

The British Army agreed to provide a unit to train government forces and carry out foot and vehicle mounted patrols designed to ensure the security of areas where training bases were located. In August, this unit was based on the Royal Irish Regiment. On 25 August, a 12-man vehicle patrol in the Occra Hills was ambushed and forced to surrender by an armed rebel group known as the West Side Boys. Negotiations led to the release of six of the men. The remainder were rescued during Operation Barras by a combined team from A Company of the 1st Battalion and the SAS.

==== Iraq ====
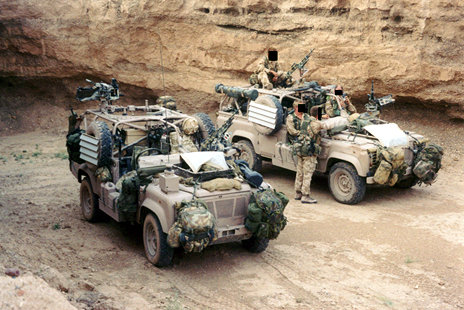
Pathfinder Platoon vehicles just before the invasion of Iraq

In January 2003, the British government announced that the 1st Armoured Division would be sent to the Persian Gulf for potential operations in Iraq. The division units would be the 7th Armoured Brigade, 3 Commando Brigade, and the 16 Air Assault Brigade with the 1st and 3rd Battalions, Parachute Regiment and the 1st Battalion, Royal Irish Regiment. The invasion began on 19 March. The battalions' first objective was to secure the Rumaylah oilfields before heading north to secure the main supply route north of Basra. By the end of the month, the 3rd Battalion had entered Basra unopposed. The other two battalions crossed the Euphrates River and occupied El Qurna. As the fighting ended, the 1st Battalion occupied Maysan province and Al Amarah, less one company sent to Baghdad to secure the British Embassy. By July, the 16 Air Assault Brigade had returned to Britain. During the war, Sergeant Gordon Robertson became the first Para to be awarded the Conspicuous Gallantry Cross for service in Al-Majar on 24 June 2003.

==== Afghanistan ====
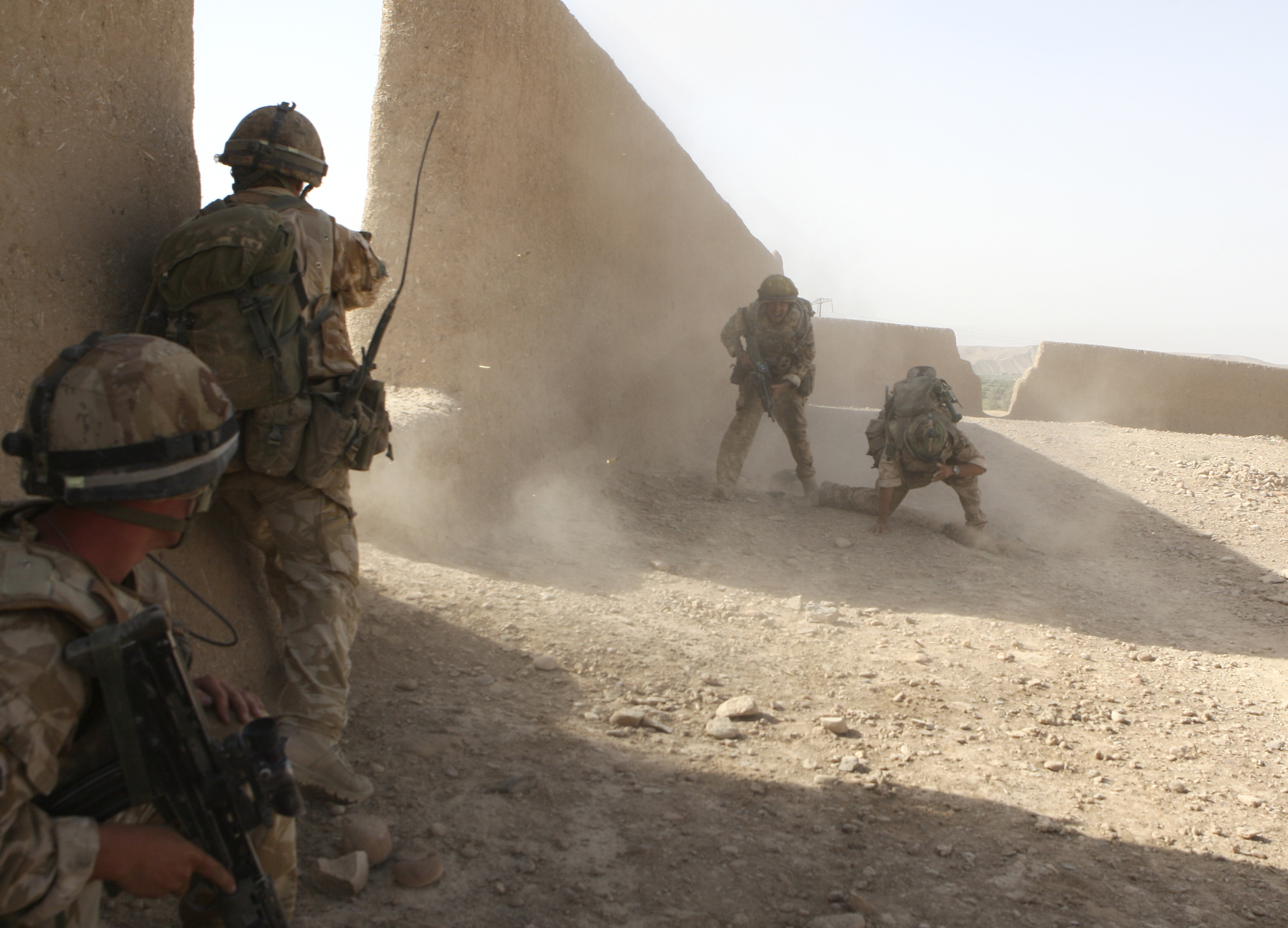
3 Para in combat in Helmand Province, Afghanistan

In May 2006, as part of the 16 Air Assault Brigade, the 3rd Battalion were sent to Afghanistan for Operation Herrick. They were part of 3,300 British troops that would be deploying to Helmand Province in southern Afghanistan as a component of the NATO International Security Assistance Force. Not expecting to be involved in any fighting, they were the only infantry unit in the brigade involved.

In December 2006, it was announced that Corporal Bryan Budd 3rd Battalion had been awarded a posthumous Victoria Cross for two separate acts of "inspirational leadership and the greatest valour" which led to his death during actions against the Taliban in Afghanistan in July and August 2006. In the same deployment, Corporal Mark Wright 3rd Battalion was awarded a posthumous George Cross. Wright was killed after entering a minefield near Kajaki Dam to save a wounded colleague that had stepped on an old Russian mine.

The brigade returned to Afghanistan from April to October 2008. This time, the three parachute battalions were reinforced by reservists from the 4th Battalion. In October 2010, the 2nd and 3rd Battalions, reinforced by the 4th Battalion, 16 Air Assault Brigade, returned to Afghanistan for their third tour.

In 2015, Lance Corporal Joshua Leakey became the third serviceman during the War in Afghanistan to receive the Victoria Cross for showing "complete disregard" for his own safety during a 2013 Taliban attack.

== Structure ==
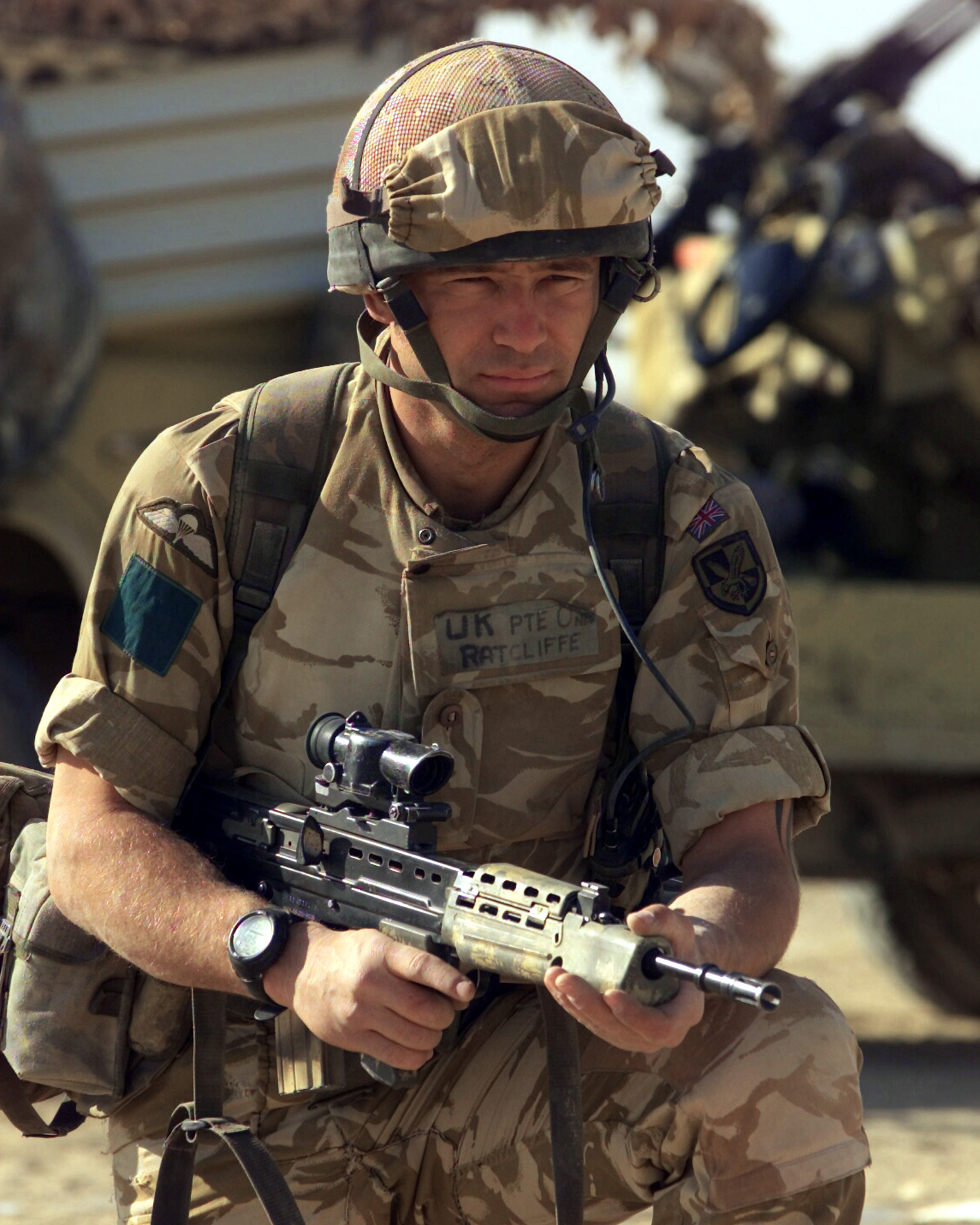
A soldier from the regiment in Iraq in 2003, armed with an L85A2

The Parachute Regiment consists of three regular army battalions, the 1st, 2nd, and 3rd, and an Army Reserve battalion, the 4th. The 1st is based at St Athan, Wales, and is permanently attached to the Special Forces Support Group (SFSG). (Note: The SFSG is based upon the 1st Battalion, Parachute Regiment and draws manpower from all three services, including a Strike Company from the Royal Marines, a Strike Platoon from the RAF Regiment and a detachment of RAF Regiment, Forward air control and Chemical, biological, radiological, and nuclear specialists.) They receive further training on additional weapons, communications equipment and specialist assault skills. All soldiers within the Parachute Regiment can expect to serve with the SFSG on rotation. This ensures that the advanced military skills taught to the SFSG are maintained in the other two regular battalions. The 2nd and 3rd battalions are the parachute infantry component of the 16 Air Assault Brigade, the army's rapid response brigade, and are based at Colchester Garrison. The reserve 4th Battalion has its headquarters at Thornbury Barracks, near Pudsey in Leeds, and companies in Glasgow, Liverpool and London.

=== Selection ===
Volunteers for the Parachute Regiment are invited to a 3-day insight course at the Parachute Regiment Assessment Course (PRAC) at Catterick Garrison. Over the three days, they have to pass a series of physical fitness assessments. Adult entry recruit training is then undertaken over a 30-week course with 2nd Infantry Training Battalion at the Infantry Training Centre at Catterick. Junior soldiers enlisted for roles in the Parachute Regiment receive initial training which is held at the Army Foundation College. Junior soldiers are also enrolled on the Operation Achilles pathway during their last 12 weeks of phase 1 training, before they transfer to phase 2 training at the Infantry Training Centre. P company puts recruits through a number of physical assessments designed to test fitness, stamina and teamwork skills. At the end of P Company, recruits take part in eight pre-parachute selection tests. Those who are successful are awarded their maroon beret.

Currently, recruits for the Parachute Regiment must be aged 17 years & 9 months to 39 years & 6 months. Potential Officers must be aged 18 to 29. After the British government removed the ban on women serving in Ground Close Combat (GCC) roles, women are permitted to join all infantry units, including the Parachute Regiment.

Hannah Knapton became the first female officer in the Parachute Regiment in March 2023.

=== Parachute training ===
On completion of basic training and entry into a battalion, recruits are posted to RAF Brize Norton for a Basic Parachute Course. Since 1995, all parachute jumps are carried out from powered aircraft. Prior to 1995, the first jump in the Basic Parachute Course was undertaken from a modified Barrage balloon, but this has since been replaced with the Skyvan. Recruits must complete four night descents with equipment to earn their "Parachute with Wings" qualification.

The last time a British battalion-sized unit parachuted into combat was in 1956 during the Suez Crisis, but it is still considered a valid method of deployment.

Details of operations for the 1st Battalion are not known, as the British government does not comment on special forces but it is believed that in 2010 a company group from the Special Forces Support Group (SFSG) parachuted operationally into Afghanistan.

== Regimental charter ==
The regimental charter is as follows:

What manner of men are these who wear the maroon red beret? They are firstly all volunteers, and are then toughened by hard physical training. As a result they have that infectious optimism and that offensive eagerness which comes from physical well being. They have jumped from the air and by doing so have conquered fear. Their duty lies in the van of the battle: they are proud of this honour and have never failed in any task. They have the highest standards in all things, whether it be skill in battle or smartness in the execution of all peace time duties. They have shown themselves to be as tenacious and determined in defence as they are courageous in attack. They are, in fact, men apart - every man an Emperor. (Statement by Field Marshal The Viscount Montgomery of Alamein).

== Regimental museum ==
The Parachute Regiment and Airborne Forces Museum is based at Duxford, Cambridgeshire.

== Regimental band ==
The Band of the Parachute Regiment is one of many British Army bands in the United Kingdom, representing the Parachute Regiment, as a component of British Army Bands Colchester, it is administratively under the Royal Corps of Army Music. Over the years, the band has visited nations like the United Arab Emirates, Iraq, Qatar, Cyprus, the Falkland Islands and Norway. It has a variety of smaller ensembles that include the brass quintet and the fanfare team. On certain occasions, the regimental mascot leads the marching band on parade.

The regiment did not have any formal musical activity until 1947, when 1st and 2nd Battalion Bands were formed in Aldershot, with a 3rd Battalion band being formed a year later. As a result of a Defence Review in 1985, the battalion Bands were disbanded and reformed to produce two larger regimental bands, the Falklands and Pegasus Bands.

== Battle honours ==
In the British Army, battle honours are awarded to regiments that have seen active service in a significant engagement or campaign, generally with a victorious outcome. The Parachute Regiment has been awarded the following honours.

- North West Europe 1942
  - Bruneval
- North Africa 1942–43
  - Oudna
  - Soudia
  - Djebel Azzag
  - Djebel Alliliga
  - El Hadjeba
  - Tamera
  - Dejebel Dahara
  - Kefel Debna
- Sicily 1943
  - Primosole Bridge
- Italy 1943–44
  - Taranto
  - Orsogna
- Greece 1944–45
  - Athens
- North West Europe 1944–45
  - Normandy Landing
  - Pegasus Bridge
  - Merville Battery
  - Breville
  - Dives Crossing
  - La Touques Crossing
  - Southern France
  - Arnhem
  - Ourthe
  - Rhine
- South Atlantic 1982
  - Falkland Islands
  - Goose Green
  - Mount Longdon
  - Wireless Ridge
- Iraq 2003
  - Al Basra

== Order of precedence ==
Preceded by The Royal Irish Regiment	Infantry Order of Precedence	Succeeded by Royal Gurkha Rifles

== See also ==
- List of battalions of the Parachute Regiment
- Parachute Regiment in the media
- Parachute Regiment and Airborne Forces Museum
- Red Devils Parachute Display Team
- The Paras, a 1982 BBC documentary series
- List of former Parachute Regiment soldiers
- List of Second World War British airborne battalions

== Bibliography ==
- Brayley, Martin (2002). The British Army 1939–45 (3): The Far East. Men at Arms. Oxford, England: Osprey Publishing. ISBN 1-84176-238-5.
- Buckingham, William F. (2005). D-Day The First 72 Hours. Stroud, Gloucestershire: Tempus Publishing. ISBN 0-7524-2842-X.
- Churchill, Randolph; Gilbert, Martin (1988). Winston S. Churchill, Volume 3. Boston, Massachusetts: Houghton Mifflin. ISBN 0-395-13153-7.
- Devlin, Gerard M (1979). Paratrooper – The Saga of Parachute And Glider Combat Troops During World War II. London, England: Robson Books. ISBN 0-312-59652-9.
- Dorman, Andrew (2009). Blair's successful war, British military intervention in Sierra Leone. Farnham, Surrey: Ashgate Publishing, Ltd. ISBN 978-0754672999.
- Ellis, Major L.F.; with Warhurst, Lieutenant-Colonel A.E. (2004) [1st. pub. HMSO 1968]. Victory in the West, Volume II: The Defeat of Germany. History of the Second World War United Kingdom Military Series. London, England: Naval & Military Press Ltd. ISBN 1-84574-059-9.
- Evans, Martin (1998). The Battle for Arnhem. Andover, Hampshire: Pitkin. ISBN 0-85372-888-7.
- Flanagan, E. M. Jr (2002). Airborne – A Combat History of American Airborne Forces. New York, New York: The Random House Publishing Group. ISBN 0-89141-688-9.
- Ferguson, Gregor (1984). The Paras 1940–84, Volume 1 of Elite series. Oxford, England: Osprey Publishing. ISBN 0-85045-573-1.
- Frost, Major General John (1980). A Drop Too Many. London, England: Cassell. ISBN 0-85052-927-1.
- Griffin, P.D (2006). Encyclopedia of Modern British Army Regiments. Stroud, England: Sutton Publishing. ISBN 0-7509-3929-X.
- Guard, Julie (2007). Airborne: World War II Paratroopers in Combat. Oxford, England: Osprey Publishing. ISBN 978-1-84603-196-0.
- Harclerode, Peter (2005). Wings of War – Airborne Warfare 1918–1945. London, England: Weidenfeld & Nicolson. ISBN 0-304-36730-3.
- Harnden, Toby (1999). Bandit Country. London, England: Hodder & Stoughton. ISBN 0-340-71736-X.
- Kershaw, Robert (1990). It Never Snows in September. Hinckley, Leicestershire: Ian Allan Publishing. ISBN 0-7110-2167-8.
- Middlebrook, Martin (1994). Arnhem 1944: The Airborne Battle. New York, New York: Viking. ISBN 0-670-83546-3.
- Moreman, Timothy Robert (2006). British Commandos 1940–46. Oxford, England: Osprey Publishing. ISBN 1-84176-986-X.
- Nigl, Alfred (2007). Silent wings Savage death. St Anna, California: Graphic Publishers. ISBN 978-1-882824-31-1.
- Norton, G G (1973). The Red Devils, the story of the British Airborne Forces. London, England: Pan Books. ISBN 0-09-957400-4.
- Otway, Lieutenant-Colonel T.B.H. (1990). The Second World War 1939–1945 Army – Airborne Forces. London, England: Imperial War Museum. ISBN 0-901627-57-7.
- Parr, Helen (2018). Our Boys: The Story of a Paratrooper. Allen Lane. ISBN 978-0241288948.
- Reynolds, David (1998). Paras: an illustrated history of Britain's airborne forces. Stroud, England: Sutton. ISBN 0-7509-1723-7.
- Rottman, Gordon; Dennis, Peter (2006). World War II Airborne Warfare Tactics Volume 136 of Elite Series. Oxford, England: Osprey Publishing. ISBN 1-84176-953-3.
- Ryan, Mike (2003). Secret Operations of the SAS. Minneapolis, Minnesota: Zenith Imprint. ISBN 0-7603-1414-4.
- Shortt, James; McBride, Angus (1981). The Special Air Service. Oxford, England: Osprey Publishing. ISBN 0-85045-396-8.
- Steer, Frank (2003). Battleground Europe – Market Garden. Arnhem – The Bridge. Barnsley, Yorkshire: Leo Cooper. ISBN 0-85052-939-5.
- Varble, Derek (2008). The Suez Crisis. New York, New York: The Rosen Publishing Group. ISBN 9781435874978.
- Waddy, John (1999). A Tour of the Arnhem Battlefields. Barnsley, Yorkshire: Pen & Sword Books Limited. ISBN 0-85052-571-3.
- Weeks, John (1978). Assault from the sky: a history of airborne warfare. New York, New York: Putnam. ISBN 0-7153-7564-4.
- Watson, Graham; Rinaldi, Richard (2005). The British Army in Germany: An Organizational History 1947–2004. Newport beach, California: Tiger Lily Publications LLC. ISBN 0-9720296-9-9.
