= List of former Parachute Regiment personnel =

The list includes those individuals who were, or have claimed to have served in the Parachute Regiment (regular or Territorial Army) of the British Army:

- Michael Asher – SAS (Reserve) soldier, author and desert explorer
- Ian Bailey – Military Medal recipient during the Falklands War
- Chay Blyth – Solo Yachtsman & Atlantic rower.
- Charles (Nish) Bruce QGM – 22 SAS Sergeant & Pilot
- Bryan Budd – VC recipient †
- Mark Burnett – television producer and Falklands War veteran
- Karl Bushby – adventurer and author
- Frank Carson – comedian and Operation Musketeer veteran
- Charlie Christodoulou, Angolan War mercenary †
- Eddie Collins – SAS Soldier †
- Lewis Collins – actor
- Billy Connolly – actor and comedian
- Bernard Cribbins – actor
- Carl Crook – British and Commonwealth lightweight boxing champion
- Peter Cundall – television presenter
- Paddy Doyle – World Record breaking multi-disciplinary athlete
- Andrew Edge – 4 PARA
- Sir Anthony Farrar-Hockley GBE, KCB, DSO*, MC †
- Dair Farrar-Hockley MC
- Joshua French – prisoner on death row of Democratic Republic of Congo
- 'Johnny' Frost – Operation Market Garden veteran †
- Costas Georgiou (also known as "Colonel Callan") – Angolan War mercenary †
- Tony Geraghty – author
- Frederick Gough – Former MP for Horsham †
- John Grayburn – Victoria Cross recipient
- Herbert 'H' Jones – Victoria Cross recipient †
- Tim Healy – actor
- Jon Hollingsworth CGC QGM – SAS soldier †
- Sir Mike Jackson – former British Army Chief of the General Staff
- Dan Jarvis – Member of Parliament for Barnsley Central.
- Al Koran (Edward C Doe) – Magician and mentalist
- Ted Loden – 1 Para
- Tom McClean – World Record breaking Atlantic sailor
- Ian McKay – Victoria Cross recipient †
- John Mogg – former DSACEUR
- Joe Murray, television personality
- Sean Olsson – Winter Olympics bobsleigh bronze medalist
- Alastair Pearson DSO***, MC, CB, OBE, TD, DL
- Sir Hew Pike KCB DSO MBE ]
- Richard Pine-Coffin, DSO and Bar, MC †
- Hugh Pond, MC †
- David Purley – F1, F3 and F5000 racing driver George Medal recipient †
- Lionel Ernest Queripel – Victoria Cross recipient †
- Peter Ratcliffe DCM MID – author
- Trevor Rees-Jones – Dodi Al-Fayed and Diana, Princess of Wales' former bodyguard
- John Ridgway – Atlantic rower.
- Chris Ryan – author and television presenter
- Al Slater MM – SAS soldier †
- Sir James Spicer
- Richard Todd – actor
- Steve Truglia – world record-breaker and stunt performer
- John Waddy Ex commander SAS, advisor on the film A Bridge Too Far.
- Dean Ward – Winter Olympic bobsleigh bronze medalist
- Derek Wilford OBE – Ex commander 1 Para
- Michael Willetts – George Cross recipient †
- Levison Wood – Author and Explorer.
- Mark Wright – George Cross recipient †
