= Glyn Worsnip =

British radio and television presenter

Glyn Worsnip (2 September 1938 – 7 June 1996) was a British radio and television presenter. Born in Highnam, Gloucestershire, he was most famous for his appearances on That's Life! (where he was teamed with Kieran Prendiville from 1973 to 1978) and on Nationwide.

== Biography ==
Worsnip attended Monmouth School and, after two years service in the RAF as a Photographic Intelligence Officer, he graduated from St John's College, Oxford with an honours degree in English. He trained as a journalist and actor, was a prolific writer of revues, and appeared on stage in revue, farce and Shakespearian productions, before his first appearance as a TV presenter on That's Life!.

In the late 1980s, Worsnip began experiencing the symptoms of a cerebellar disorder. In 1986, he developed dysarthria (slurred speech) as part of an initial cerebellar ataxia diagnosis. In his autobiography, Up the Down Escalator, he mentions being diagnosed with multiple system atrophy (MSA) at the National Hospital for Neurology and Neurosurgery. MSA is a progressive, adult onset disorder characterised by any combination of parkinsonism, autonomic failure (see nervous system) and cerebellar ataxia.

In 1982, Worsnip wrote and presented the critically acclaimed documentary ‘The Paras’, which charted the progress of the young recruits of 480 Platoon attempting to become members of the Parachute Regiment on the eve of the Falklands War.

The BBC did not renew his contract in 1987.

He made the programme A Lone Voice, about his struggle with MSA, which would claim his life in 1996 at the age of 57. It was broadcast on BBC Radio 4 in March 1988, and has been described as "the most engaging programme in Radio 4's history".

== Autobiography ==
- Up the Down Escalator – (1990) Glyn Worsnip
