= A Lone Voice =

- Genre: feature
- Running time: 45 mins
- Language(s): English
- Home station: BBC Radio 4
- Hosted by: Glyn Worsnip
- Produced by: Sharon Banoff
- Original release: March 2 – March 2, 1988
- No. of episodes: 1

A Lone Voice was a radio programme consisting of Glyn Worsnip’s autobiographical account of living with a serious medical condition. First aired on March 2, 1988 (repeated March 6, 1988), the programme formed the first episode of Soundtrack, at that time a new series of ‘films for radio’ in the tradition of fly on the wall realism.

== History ==
Glyn Worsnip was a well-known radio and television personality from the 1970s and ’80s, whose voice had become part of the fabric of Radio 4, where he presented programmes including: Sound Archives Feature, the Saturday Feature, Stop Press, as well as Radio 2’s The Press Gang.

By 1987, the BBC started receiving complaints from listeners who observed that Worsnip’s speech was not as fluent as it ought to be or it used to be. These speech difficulties which ultimately cost him his career were caused by a rare and progressive condition cerebellar ataxia. In a rare step for that time, Worsnip came out about his illness and the realities of living with such a condition.

Described by Peter Davalle in The Times as ‘a medical history told by the sufferer’, the programme was a warts and all audio diary detailing hospital visits, conversations with other sufferers, confidences with his family, and self-observations.

A Lone Voice was the most engaging programme in Radio 4’s history with the BBC taking on extra staff to manage the volume of listeners’ letters.

In subsequent years this ground-breaking format of a respected presenter speaking candidly on serious or terminal illness has been taken up by others including The World at One presenter Nick Clarke whose audio diary Fighting to Be Normal was broadcast in 2006 and journalist Steve Hewlett's conversations on the PM programme in 2016-17.
