= John Williams (British Army officer) =

John Williams MBE DCM (1934–2002) was a British Army officer.

John Williams, known as Patch after losing an eye during the battle of Plaman Mapu during the Indonesia–Malaysia Confrontation, joined the Army as a bandsman in 1949. He transferred to the infantry in 1954. He served with the Parachute Regiment in the Suez Canal Zone, Cyprus and Borneo.

On 27 April 1965, Williams's company base at Plaman Mapu, on the border between the Malaysian state of Sarawak and Indonesia, came under heavy attack by the Indonesian infantry. Williams was awarded the DCM for gallantry during what would be known as the Battle of Plaman Mapu, where he served as a Company Sergeant Major with the 2nd Battalion, Parachute Regiment. An extract from his citation for the DCM reads: "The successful defence of the position against great odds was largely due to his courage, his example and leadership and to his own direct intervention in the battle at every crisis and at every point of maximum danger."

He underwent many operations as a result of injuries sustained during the battle. He later became Regimental Sergeant Major (RSM) of the 2nd Battalion, Parachute Regiment. In 1969 he was the RSM of the 10th Battalion, Parachute Regiment. He was commissioned in 1971. He was awarded the MBE and appointed Lieutenant-Colonel Staff Quartermaster of the Army Staff College, Camberley in 1983. He retired from the Army in 1989.

He was president of The Gallantry Medallists' League from 2000. He was appointed MBE in 1983 and DCM in 1965.
