= The Paras =

- Genre: Documentary
- Created by: Glyn Worsnip
- Written by: Frank Hilton
- Presented by: Glyn Worsnip
- Theme music composer: Conn Bernard
- Country of origin: United Kingdom
- Original language: English
- No. of seasons: 1
- No. of episodes: 7

Production
- Producer: Bill Jones
- Editor: Graham Dean
- Camera setup: Dave Gray
- Running time: 60 minutes

Original release
- Network: BBC1
- Release: March 1983

The Paras is a 1983 BBC TV documentary series about British Parachute Regiment recruits of 480 (Training) Platoon undertaking their basic training at the Depot of the Parachute Regiment (Depot Para) at Aldershot Garrison between January and June 1982. The series was broadcast on BBC1 in March and April 1983. It was later repeated in 1984, with an update on the platoon members' lives in the last episode.

Narrated by Glyn Worsnip, it was shot in the fly-on-the-wall style, giving the viewing public a unique insight to military life. Production of the programme started just prior to the Falklands War.

The series was accompanied by a book of the same name written by the principal researcher Frank Hilton

The series was accompanied by a score of military music written and arranged by Conn Bernard.

Some of those recruits passing out in 1982 went on to have long and distinguished careers including Dean Ward and Rod Stoner. In addition one of the platoon staff corporals, Al Slater was later killed in Northern Ireland whilst a member of the SAS. This incident and some of this involvement in the SAS were described in two of Andy McNab's books Immediate Action and Seven Troop.

== Production credits ==
- Written and presented – Glyn Worsnip
- Camera – Dave Gray
- Sound – Mervyn Broadway
- Dubbing Editor – David Matthews
- Dubbing Mixer – Ken Haimes
- Title Music – Conn Bernard
- Graphic Designer – William Blaik
- Production Assistant – Caroline Savage
- Research – Frank Hilton, Chris Wilkie
- Film Editor – Graham Dean
- Series Editor – David Harrison
- Producer – Bill Jones

== Episodes ==
No.	Title	Produced by	Written by	Original release date
1	"480 Platoon"	Bill Jones	Frank Hilton	March 1983
The recruits of 480 (Training) Platoon form up at Browning Barracks, Aldershot and are introduced to army life.
2	"The Maroon Machine"	Bill Jones	Frank Hilton	March 1983
Basic tactics and fitness training in the Aldershot area
3	"Basic Wales"	Bill Jones	Frank Hilton	March 1983
Battle Camp at Sennybridge Training Area, Wales.
4	"'P' Company"	Bill Jones	Frank Hilton	March 1983
Pre-Parachute (P company) selection in Aldershot.
5	"Wings"	Bill Jones	Frank Hilton	April 1983
Basic Parachute Training at RAF Brize Norton.
6	"Ready For Anything"	Bill Jones	Frank Hilton	April 1983
Advanced Tactics training.
7	"Down To Earth"	Bill Jones	Frank Hilton	April 1983
The recruits are posted to Northern Ireland on operations. (The 1984 repeat included an extra 10 minutes update on the original recruits 2 years later)
