= Old Courthouse =

Old Courthouse may refer to:

== Australia ==
- Old Court House, Perth, located in the Supreme Court Gardens in Barrack Street, Perth, Western Australia

== Ireland ==
- Old Courthouse, Coleraine, Coleraine, County Londonderry, Northern Ireland

== Malaysia ==
- Kuching Old Courthouse, Kuching, Sarawak, Malaysia

== United Kingdom ==
- Old Court House Recreation Ground, a public park in High Barnet in the London Borough of Barnet
- The Old Court House, an eighteenth-century house in Richmond Upon Thames
- The Old Court House, Ruthin, Denbighshire, North Wales
- Old Courthouse, Cockermouth, Cumbria
- Old Courthouse, Ripon, North Yorkshire

== United States ==
- Old Hillsborough County Courthouse, Tampa, Florida
- Honolulu Courthouse, Honolulu, Hawaii, also known as the Old Courthouse after 1874
- Second St. Joseph County Courthouse, South Bend, Indiana, also known as Old Courthouse
- Old Courthouse (Greensburg, Kentucky), listed on the National Register of Historic Places (NRHP)
- Old Courthouse Square (Lake Providence, Louisiana), Lake Providence, Louisiana
- Old Courthouse Museum – Natchitoches, Natchitoches, Louisiana
- Old Warren County Courthouse, Vicksburg, Mississippi, also known as Old Courthouse
- Old Courthouse (St. Louis), in St. Louis, Missouri.
- Old Berkeley County Courthouse (South Carolina), Mount Pleasant, South Carolina, also known as Old Courthouse
- Old Newberry County Courthouse, Newberry, South Carolina, also known as Old Courthouse
- Old Courthouse and Warehouse Historic District, Sioux Falls, South Dakota, listed on the NRHP
- Fredericksburg Memorial Library, Fredericksburg, Texas, also known as Old Courthouse
- Old Courthouse (Buena Vista, Virginia)
- Dickensonville, Virginia, formerly known as Old Court House
