= County Hall, Coleraine =

County building in Coleraine, Northern Ireland

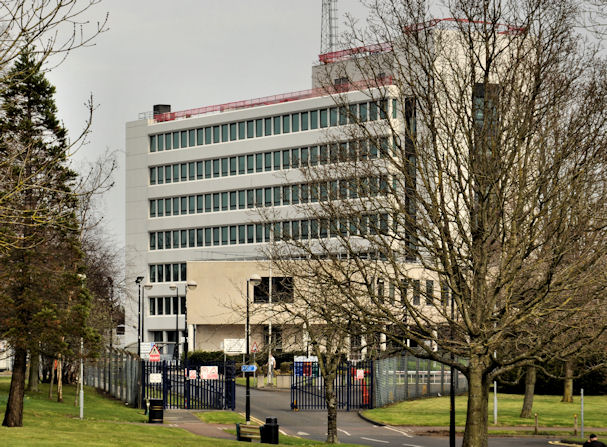
- County Hall, Coleraine

- Location within Northern Ireland

General information
- Architectural style: Modern style
- Location: Coleraine, County Londonderry, Northern Ireland
- Coordinates: 55.1350°N 6.6768°W
- Completed: 1970

Design and construction
- Architects: Smyth, Cowser and Partners

County Hall is a municipal facility in Coleraine, County Londonderry, Northern Ireland. It served as the headquarters of Londonderry County Council from 1970 to 1973.

== History ==
During the late 19th century and the first half of the 20th century, meetings of Londonderry County Council were held at the Coleraine Courthouse. In the 1960s, county leaders decided that the courthouse was too cramped to accommodate the county council in the context of the county council's increasing administrative responsibilities, especially while the courthouse was still acting as a facility for dispensing justice, and therefore chose to acquire the site of a former manor house in the grounds of Coleraine Castle.

The new building, which was designed by Smyth, Cowser and Partners in the modern style, was opened on 6 July 1970. The design for the seven-storey building involved continuous bands of glazing with concrete panelling above and below. In February 1972, it was the venue for the hearings of the Widgery Inquiry, chaired by Lord Widgery, into "the events on Sunday, 30 January 1972 which led to loss of life in connection with the procession in Londonderry on that day".

After the county council was abolished in 1973, the building became the regional office of several government departments. The local district of the Northern Health and Social Services Board was located in County Hall but relocated to the former nurses' home on the Route Hospital site in Ballymoney in 1991. Approximately 160 civil servants were still employed by the Northern Ireland Assembly in the building as at 1 January 2014. However, in March 2014, about 300 jobs associated with Northern Ireland's Driver and Vehicle Agency were transferred from County Hall to the Driver and Vehicle Licensing Agency in Swansea.
