= Gerald Donaghey =

Bloody Sunday victim (1954–1972)

- Donaghey, c. 1971
- Born: Gerald Vincent Donaghey; 20 February 1954; Derry, Northern Ireland
- Died: 30 January 1972 (aged 17); Derry, Northern Ireland
- Cause of death: Homicide (gunshot wound to stomach)
- Resting place: Derry City Cemetery; 54.593287°N 7.203020°W
- Known for: Victim of Bloody Sunday massacre

Gerald Vincent Donaghey (20 February 1954 – 30 January 1972) was an Irishman from the Bogside, Derry, Northern Ireland. A member of Na Fianna Éireann, he was killed by members of the 1st Battalion, Parachute Regiment on Bloody Sunday in Derry.

== Early life ==
Both of Donaghey's parents had died by 1966, when he was 12 years old, and he was raised by his elder siblings, Mary and Patrick. According to Donaghey's older sister, Mary Doherty, her brother was a bright scholar but "one of those children who was very bright but who just never used his brains."

In 1969, at the age of 15, Donaghey and his siblings moved to Meenan Square, where he lived until his death. In 1970, Donaghey obtained a job in the Waterside with Carlin's Brewery as a delivery hand on a beer lorry. He lost this employment shortly before his seventeenth birthday in 1971 when he was sentenced to six months' imprisonment for throwing stones at the Royal Ulster Constabulary. Donaghey was released on 24 December and returned to live with his sister in Meenan Square.

At the time of his death at age 17, Donaghey had been out of prison for just five weeks. He was unemployed and seeking work.

== Bloody Sunday ==
On 30 January 1972, 27 civil rights protesters were shot by members of the 1st Battalion of the British Parachute Regiment during a Northern Ireland Civil Rights Association march in the Bogside area of the city. Fourteen people, six of whom were minors, died in the incident. Donaghey was shot in the stomach while running to safety between Glenfada Park and Abbey Park. Gerard McKinney (aged 35) was fatally shot as he attempted to assist Donaghey.

Shortly after he had been shot, Donaghey was brought to a nearby house by bystanders where he was examined by a doctor. His pockets were turned out in an effort to identify him.

A later Royal Ulster Constabulary photograph of Donaghey's corpse showed nail bombs in his pockets. Neither those who searched his pockets in the house immediately after the shooting nor the British army medical officer (Soldier 138) who pronounced his death shortly afterwards say they saw any bombs. Donaghey had been a member of Fianna Éireann, a youth section of the republican movement. Paddy Ward, then a leader of the Fianna and an alleged police informant, and who gave evidence at the Saville Inquiry, claimed that he had given two nail bombs to Donaghey several hours before he was shot dead.

=== Widgery Tribunal ===
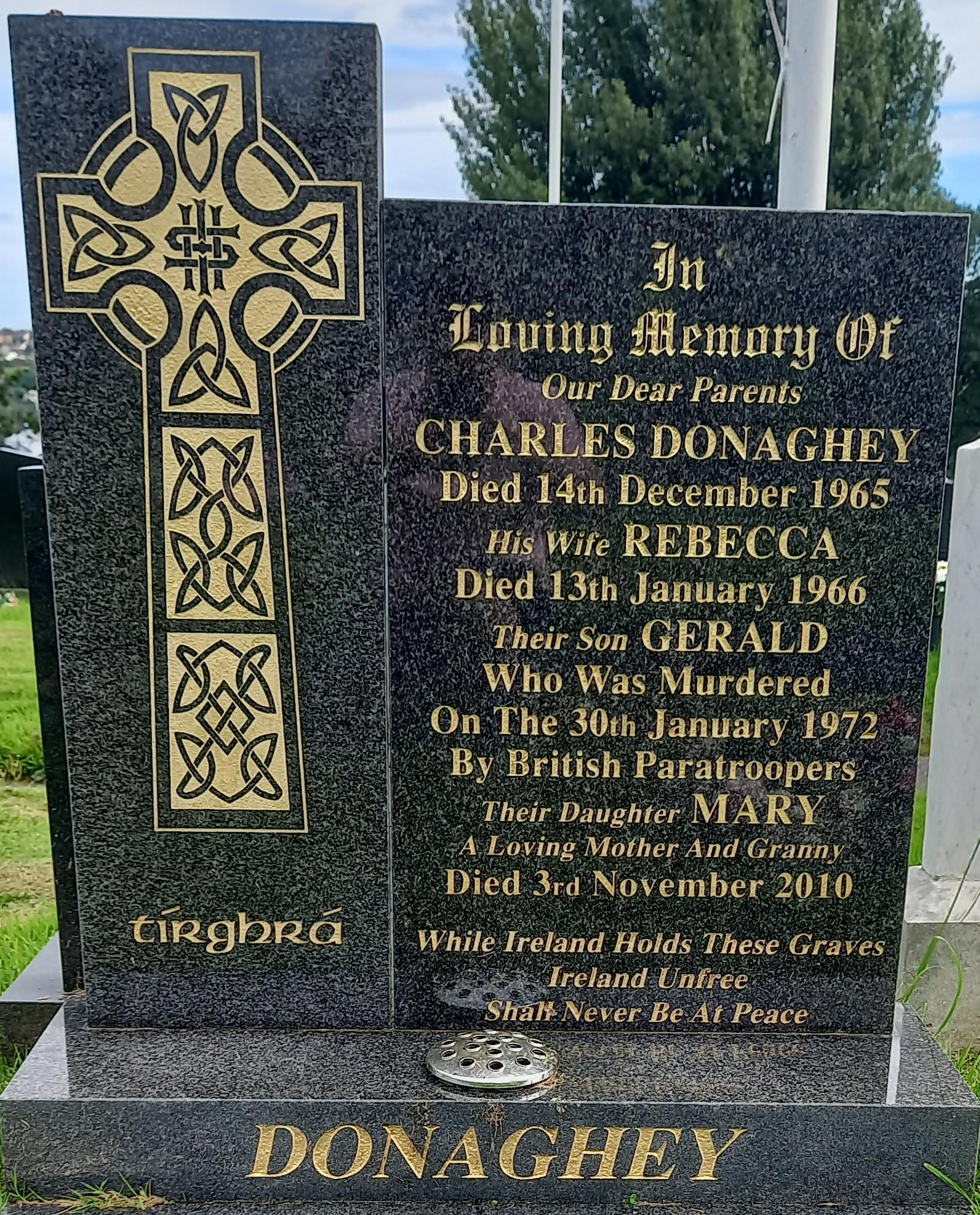
Donaghey's grave in the City Cemetery, Derry

The circumstances surrounding Donaghey's death were among the most hotly contested following Bloody Sunday. The British Army and the Royal Ulster Constabulary stated that nail bombs had been found inside the pockets of both his denim jacket and jeans after he was shot. The first inquiry into Bloody Sunday, the since discredited Widgery Tribunal, chaired by Lord Widgery, agreed with the military. Donaghey's family and others claim the nail bombs were planted by troops to blacken the youth's name and provide an excuse for the killings.

=== Saville Inquiry ===
In his closing statement during the Saville Inquiry, Christopher Clarke, QC, counsel to the inquiry, told the tribunal judges that they must decide if Donaghey had had nail bombs in his possession when he was shot dead. Donaghey was photographed at an army post with four nail bombs in his pockets but a number of civilians who tried to take him to hospital told the tribunal he was unarmed. A British soldier who stopped the car containing Donaghey at a checkpoint and subsequently drove him the rest of the way to hospital said he had no bombs; and a British military doctor who examined him stated he saw no bombs either.

After a lengthy examination of the evidence, in the inquiry's report Lord Saville concludes "in our view Gerald Donaghey was probably in possession of the nail bombs when he was shot", but also notes "It remains to say, for reasons given elsewhere in this report, that Gerald Donaghey was not shot because of his possession of nail bombs".
