= Old Court =

Old Court may refer to the following:

- Old Court Road, a major road in Baltimore County, Maryland
- Old Court Metro Subway Station, one of 14 stops on the Baltimore Metro Subway
- Old Court Savings and Loans, a bank that collapsed during the 1980s
- Old Court-New Court controversy, a political controversy in Kentucky
- Old Court (novel), an 1867 novel by William Harrison Ainsworth
- Old Courthouse (disambiguation)
