= Londonderry County Council =

Local authority in Northern Ireland, 1899 to 1973

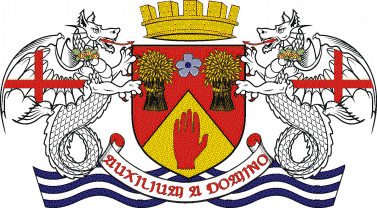

History
- Founded: 1 April 1899
- Disbanded: 1 October 1973
- Succeeded by: Coleraine Borough Council; Cookstown District Council; Derry City Council; Limavady Borough Council; Magherafelt District Council

Meeting place
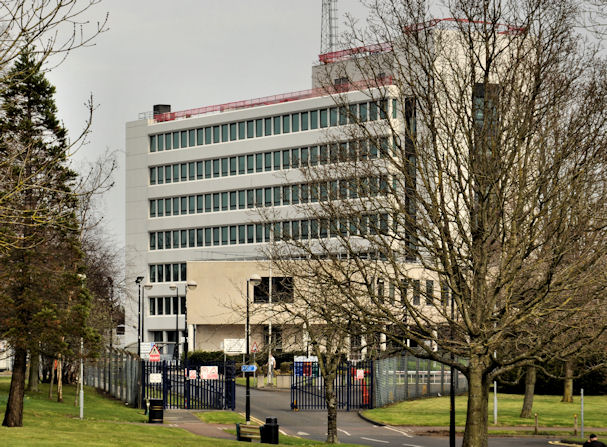
- County Hall, Coleraine

Londonderry County Council was the authority responsible for local government in County Londonderry, Northern Ireland, from 1899 to 1973.

== History ==
Londonderry County Council was established on 1 April 1899 under orders issued in accordance with the Local Government (Ireland) Act 1898 for the administrative county of County Londonderry, which succeeded the former judicial county of Londonderry, except for the city of Londonderry.

The Local Government (Ireland) Act 1919 introduced proportional representation by means of the single transferable vote (PR-STV) for the 1920 Londonderry County Council election. PR-STV was abolished in Northern Ireland under the Local Government Act 1922, with a reversion to first-past-the-post for the 1924 Northern Ireland local elections, the first local elections held in the new jurisdiction.

It was originally based at the Coleraine Courthouse but moved to County Hall in Coleraine in 1970.

The council was abolished in accordance with the Local Government Act (Northern Ireland) 1972 on 1 October 1973.
