= J. W. Lonoaea =

Hawaiian politician (??–1874)

Member of the Kingdom of Hawaiʻi House of Representatives for the district of Wailuku, Maui
- In office February 14, 1872 – March 16, 1874
- Monarchs: Kamehameha V Lunalilo; Kalākaua

Personal details
- Died: March 16, 1874 Wailuku, Maui

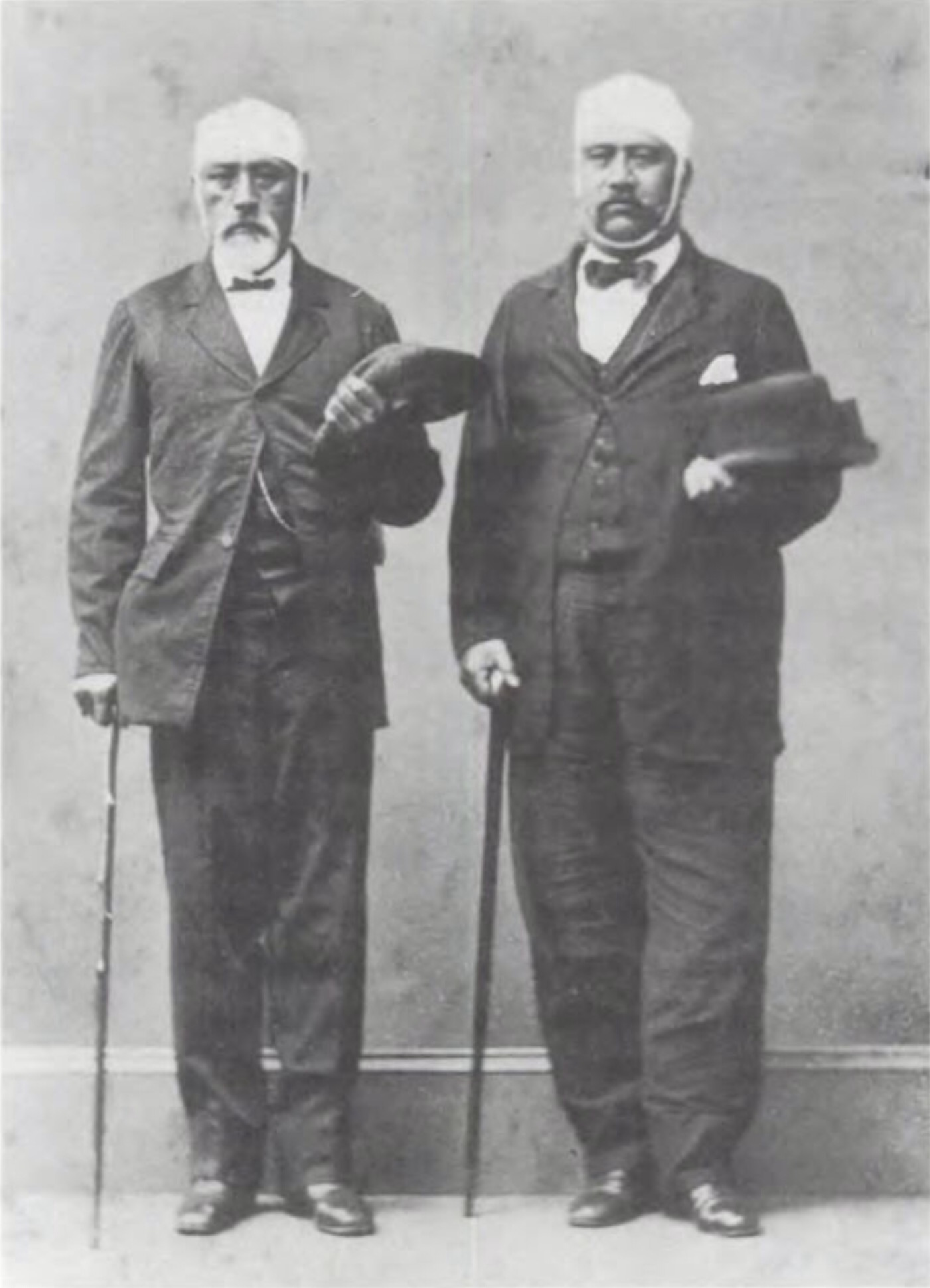
Representatives William Thomas Martin and William Luther Moehonua, survivors of the attack on the legislative assembly.

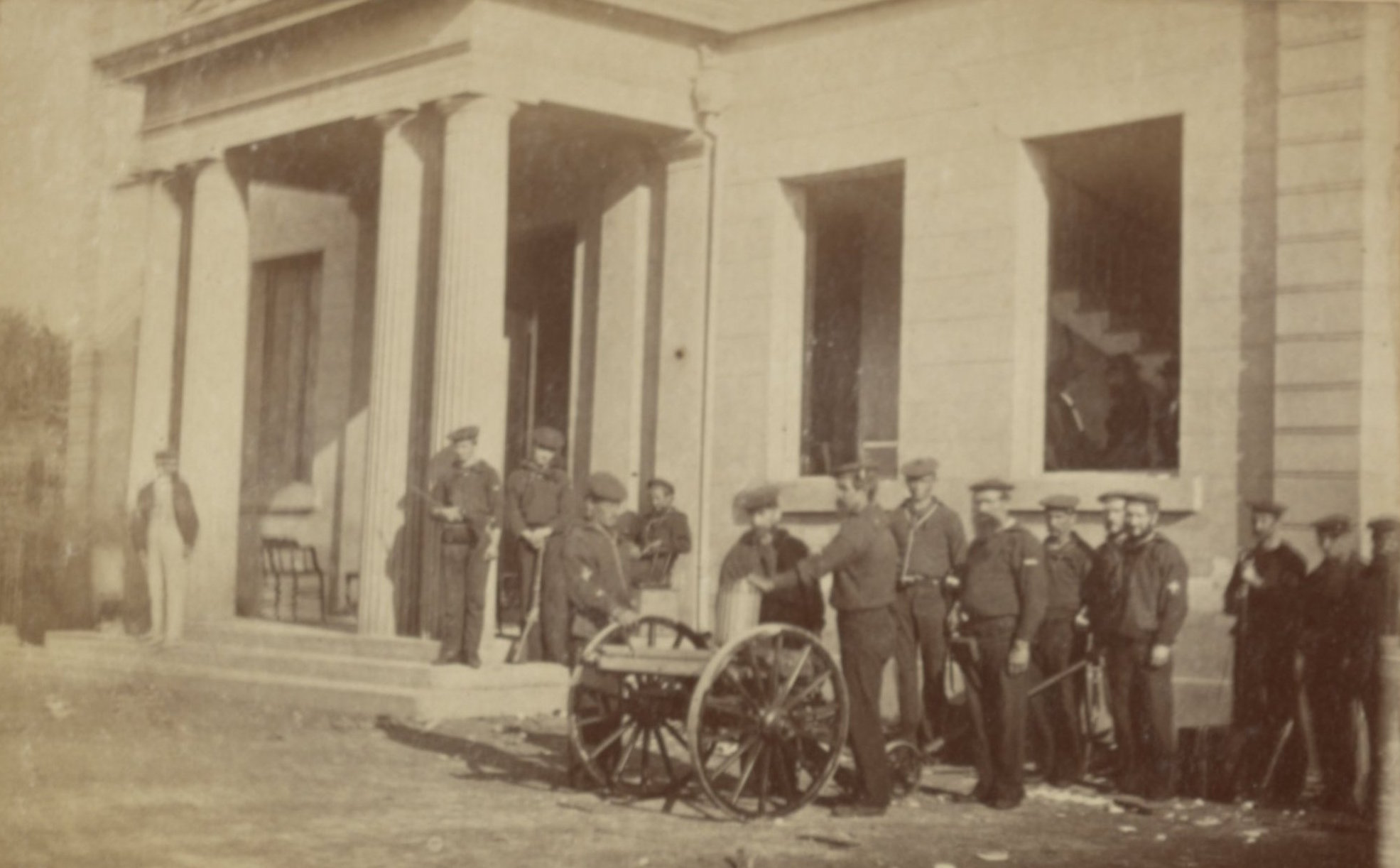
Gatling guns and soldiers landed to quell the violent mob during the 1874 election riot

J. W. Lonoaea (died March 16, 1874) was a politician of the Kingdom of Hawaiʻi who served in the House of Representatives of the Legislature of the Kingdom from 1872 until his death. Following the death of King Lunalilo, it fell to the legislature to choose the next monarch from amongst the native-born high chiefs, though only three candidates were considered seriously: Bernice Pauahi Bishop, David Kalākaua, and Queen Emma. Lonoaea voted with the majority in supporting Kalākaua, and was one of the thirteen legislators to be injured by supporters of Queen Emma in the ensuing 1874 Honolulu Courthouse riot. Lonoaea was the only legislator who did not survive his injuries.

== Life and career ==
Lonoaea entered the service of the Hawaiian government during the last year of the reign of King Kamehameha V. His election as a member of the House of Representatives the lower house of the Hawaiian legislature) for the district of Wailuku on the island of Maui was reported on February 14, 1872; he was re-elected in 1874 for a second term. He served as a representative from 1872 to 1874, including the regular biennial session of 1872 and the two extra sessions (called to elect the monarch) in 1873 and 1874. King Kamehameha V was the ruling monarch at when Lonoaea began his first legislative term, but died at the end of 1872; having no heir, the 1864 Constitution of the Kingdom of Hawaii called for the legislature to select the next monarch. By both popular vote and the unanimous decision of the legislators, Lunalilo became the first elected king of Hawaii.

=== 1874 election and riot ===
On February 12, 1874, following the death of King Lunalilo, a special session was called to elect a new monarch from amongst the aliʻi; this was the second time in Hawaiian history that this duty fell to the legislature. During the election that followed, David Kalākaua ran against Queen Emma, the widow of Kamehameha IV who had reigned until his death in 1863. Bernice Pauahi Bishop, who had previously declined the throne in 1872 when it was offered by Kamehameha V, was also considered. During the session, Lonoaea offered opening prayers before legislative president Paul Nahaolelua took the chair. The assembly voted thirty-nine to six in favor of Kalākaua over Emma.

The subsequent announcement triggered the Honolulu Courthouse riot as Emmaite supporters hunted down and attacked native legislators who supported Kalākaua. Historian Jon Kamakawiwoʻole Osorio noted that "the attacks were conducted by Natives against Natives over issues of loyalty and kanaka identity". The rioters targeted mainly these men, tearing apart the courthouse and creating makeshift clubs to use as bludgeons. One legislator was thrown from a second-story window of the courthouse. In order to quell the civil disruption, American and British troops were landed with the permission of the Hawaiian government, and the rioters were arrested.

=== Death ===
Lonoaea was one of thirteen legislators injured during the riot by supporters of Queen Emma. The local Hawaiian newspapers reported that only Representatives Kipi, Haupu, Nahinu, Kakani and Moehonua were "severely injured" or "dangerously injured", receiving blows to their heads, while the injuries of Lonoaea and others were reported as less severe. He returned to his home in Wailuku to recover but was ultimately the only legislator not to recover from his injuries. With travel and communications slow between the islands of Oahu and Maui, news from Wailuku took time to reach Honolulu. The Hawaiian Gazette prematurely reported Lonoaea's death on March 6, which The Pacific Commercial Advertiser had to correct. Lonoaea actually died from his injuries on March 16, 1874, at his home on Wailuku, but news confirming his passing did not reach Honolulu until five days later. His seat in the legislative session and his duties representing Wailuku were taken over by N. Kepoikai. Later the same year, the legislature allotted a four-hundred-dollar permanent settlement to Lonoaea's wife.

== Bibliography ==
- Alexander, William DeWitt (1891). A Brief History of the Hawaiian People. New York: American Book Company. OCLC 187412143.
- Dabagh, Jean; Lyons, Curtis Jere; Hitchcock, Harvey Rexford (1974). Dabagh, Jean (ed.). "A King is Elected: One Hundred Years Ago" (PDF). The Hawaiian Journal of History. 8. Honolulu: Hawaiian Historical Society: 76–89. hdl:10524/112. OCLC 60626541.
- Hawaii (1918). Lydecker, Robert Colfax (ed.). Roster Legislatures of Hawaii, 1841–1918. Honolulu: Hawaiian Gazette Company. OCLC 60737418.
- Kaeo, Peter; Queen Emma (1976). Korn, Alfons L. (ed.). News from Molokai, Letters Between Peter Kaeo & Queen Emma, 1873–1876. Honolulu: The University Press of Hawaii. hdl:10125/39980. ISBN 978-0-8248-0399-5. OCLC 2225064.
- Kanahele, George S. (1999). Emma: Hawaii's Remarkable Queen. Honolulu: University of Hawaii Press. ISBN 978-0-8248-2240-8. OCLC 40890919.
- Kuykendall, Ralph Simpson (1967). The Hawaiian Kingdom 1874–1893, The Kalakaua Dynasty. Vol. 3. Honolulu: University of Hawaii Press. ISBN 978-0-87022-433-1. OCLC 500374815.
- Osorio, Jon Kamakawiwoʻole (2002). Dismembering Lāhui: A History of the Hawaiian Nation to 1887. Honolulu: University of Hawaii Press. ISBN 0-8248-2549-7. OCLC 48579247.
- Rossi, Pualiʻiliʻimaikalani (December 2013). No Ka Pono ʻOle O Ka Lehulehu: The 1874 Election of Hawaiʻi's Moʻi And The Kanaka Maoli Response (PDF) (Thesis). Honolulu: University of Hawaii at Manoa. hdl:10125/100744.
- United States. Navy Department (1875). Annual Report of the Secretary of the Navy. Washington, DC: U.S. Government Printing Office. OCLC 2480810.
