= Widgery Tribunal =

First investigation into killings and shootings by British soldiers in Derry in 1972

The Widgery Tribunal was a judicial inquiry established by the British government in early 1972 to investigate a large number of deaths and shootings caused by the actions of the British Army in the Bogside, Derry, on 30 January 1972 during what became known as Bloody Sunday. On 31 January 1972 the lord chief justice of England, Lord Widgery, was appointed by British prime minister Edward Heath to conduct this inquiry. Sitting by himself, Widgery worked quickly: he heard evidence, first in Coleraine, Northern Ireland, in February and March of that year, with further hearings held in London in March. One hundred and fourteen people were called to give evidence.

His report was completed in early April and presented to Parliament on 19 April 1972. It noted that the organisers of the illegal civil rights march on 30 January 1972 had "created a highly dangerous situation in which a clash between demonstrators and the security forces was almost inevitable". While finding that on one occasion shooting by 1 Para was unjustified and "bordered on the reckless", he largely exonerated the soldiers of that regiment who shot dead 13 men and injured many more on the day. He also voiced "strong suspicion" that some of those killed had fired weapons or been in possession of bombs. The Saville Inquiry later concluded that Lord Widgery had faced much "inaccurate and misleading" evidence given by senior army officers.

The families of the deceased and wounded, as well as the nationalist community in Northern Ireland, refused to accept Widgery's findings. It was not until the 1990s that new evidence led the Labour government of Tony Blair to order a new inquiry into Bloody Sunday. The exhaustive Saville Inquiry began in 1998. It drew extensively on evidence presented to the Widgery Tribunal but its findings deviated substantially from those of Widgery, which it ultimately superseded.

The findings of the Widgery Tribunal are now often regarded as discredited.

Widgery Tribunal report

== Background ==
During an arrest operation towards the end of a civil rights march in Derry on 30 January 1972, soldiers from 1 Para shot dead 13 men, with a fourteenth dying later; many more were injured. The British Army claimed that the deceased were gunmen or nail-bombers, while local people were adamant that the dead or injured were innocent. In view of this large loss of life in a UK city, the British government moved in a "rapid and apparently decisive" manner. Resolutions were passed in each house of parliament at Westminster on 1 February 1972 to establish an inquiry under the Tribunals of Inquiry (Evidence) Act 1921, "into the events on Sunday, 30th January 1972, which led to loss of life in connection with the procession in Londonderry on that day".

Lord Widgery, lord chief justice of England, accepted a request by Heath to conduct this inquiry.

== Venue and proceedings ==
Lord Widgery was the sole member of the tribunal. Leading counsel were: for the tribunal, John Stocker QC; for the Ministry of Defence, Brian Gibbens QC; for the next of kin of twelve of the deceased and for the injured, James McSparran QC. The families of the dead and injured received limited legal representation only.

Widgery's initial intention was for the inquiry to be held in Derry, in order to encourage witnesses to give evidence: in the end, for reasons of security and convenience, his choice was the County Hall in Coleraine, a town 30 miles from Derry. A preliminary hearing took place on 14 February 1972 and the three weeks of main hearings went ahead from 21 February to 14 March. Closing speeches were delivered on 16–17 and 20 March at the Royal Courts of Justice in London. Widgery completed his task swiftly, finishing his report on 10 April 1972, and presented it to parliament on 19 April.

A number of witnesses planned to boycott an inquiry in which they lacked faith; however, many heeded calls to cooperate by giving written statements. Sixty-six civilians were called to give evidence, including seven of the wounded, seven clergymen, six doctors and a large number reporting on the march; for the military, 40 soldiers appeared; the testimony of eight policemen was also heard. Over 3.5 minutes of overhead footage taken by an Army helicopter was shown to the tribunal. Widgery found the many photographs taken by professional photographers on the day to be of great assistance. There was a much larger number of statements taken, from which Widgery himself decided who should be called to give evidence. Evidence was not heard from most civilian eyewitnesses. Raymond McClean – a doctor who had examined four of the dead – attended, expecting to give evidence, but was not called.

Many witnesses were requested to amplify their evidence by referring to a model of the Bogside which had been specially made. The inquiry team also asked for the creation of a set of photographs taken from above to show the trajectories of shots claimed by soldiers on Bloody Sunday. Forensics also played an important role, with the tribunal commissioning experts to determine whether any of the dead or injured had been carrying weapons. In particular, a paraffin test was used to identify any lead residues deposited by the discharge of weapons.

Widgery heard testimony from soldiers, both officers and enlisted men, who claimed fire had been returned at gunmen or petrol- or nail-bombers. In their evidence civilians were adamant that no one who had attended the march was carrying a weapon. Other than for several senior officers, some police officers and each soldier called to give evidence did so anonymously for their security and that of their families. The military witnesses were accorded a cipher (letters of the alphabet for those who claimed to have fired live ammunition and numbers for the others). Soldiers were permitted to arrive dressed in a combat jacket with no markings and to wear dark glasses before removing them when facing Lord Widgery.

Concern was expressed in the House of Commons that Lord Widgery had changed the terms of reference by restricting his inquiry to a period in time of 90 minutes and a specific geographical location in Derry: the government had previously informed the house that no restrictions would be placed on him. It was suggested that Widgery had acted in this way in response to a draft article submitted to him by The Sunday Times. In a phone call with that paper's editor, Widgery made clear that an in-depth feature on Bloody Sunday due to be published on 6 February should not appear while he was undertaking his inquiry; he would apply the rules of contempt if these wishes were not adhered to. The article was held back, with the paper reporting on 6 February: "The law is that until the Lord Chief Justice completes his enquiry nobody may offer to the British public any consecutive account of the events in Derry last weekend".

Lord Widgery's directive also led to the suppression of a report on Bloody Sunday by The Observer newspaper that proposed to reconstruct what had taken place in Derry.

The detailed investigation into Bloody Sunday by The Sunday Times was not published until 23 April 1972, immediately after Widgery had reported. In 2025 The Sunday Times commented that its 1972 investigation "repudiated the Widgery Inquiry's take on the events of the day".

Widgery has been accused of threatening to muzzle the British media in advance of his report being published.

== Tribunal report ==
Widgery's primary conclusion put the blame for the deaths on the march organisers for creating a "highly dangerous situation" where a confrontation was "almost inevitable". He also found that if the British Army had continued its "low key" policy towards intervening in the Bogside, without undertaking a major operation to detain rioters, then that Sunday afternoon might have seen no major confrontation. Soldiers, Widgery found, were shot at in Rossville Street on entering the Bogside and returned fire on identified gunmen. There was no general breakdown in discipline.

While much underestimating the number of those marching – from 3,000 to 5,000, when the correct total was from 10,000 to 15,000 – Widgery agreed that its organisers had tried to avoid confrontation with the security forces. He also concluded that with insufficient separation between peaceful marchers and rioters having been effected, the wisdom of conducting an arrest operation was "debatable".

Widgery, who was "accustomed to listening to witnesses", said he found the demeanour of the soldiers convincing. Noting that if the soldiers were wrong about having come under fire, "they were parties in a lying conspiracy which must have come to light in the rigorous cross-examination to which they were subjected", he preferred their evidence to that of civilians. Because the soldiers' first endeavour was simply to arrest people, "there was no reason why they should have suddenly desisted and begun to shoot unless they had come under fire themselves".

The Saville Inquiry later concluded that Lord Widgery had heard "inaccurate and misleading" evidence given by senior officers. One former paratrooper also later testified to the Saville Inquiry that the statement he had written for the Widgery Inquiry was torn up and replaced by his superiors with one that bore "no relation with fact". The Widgery Tribunal found that, with only one or two exceptions, the soldiers were telling the truth. The judge's strongest criticism of 1 Para was that their "firing bordered on the reckless" in Glenfada Park.

While no gelignite residue was located on the clothing of the victims, scientists determined that some of those killed had either fired a weapon or been in close proximity to someone who had opened fire. The tribunal decided, on the balance of probabilities, that nail-bombs found on the body of Gerald Donaghey had been in his possession throughout the period under consideration and had not been planted by the army at a late stage. A number of civilians and army people had not seen these "bulky" items anywhere on Donaghey after he had been shot. Widgery ruled out the possibility of lead particles, found on the hands of two of the victims, having been transferred accidentally – from the hands of soldiers who had fired ammunition on the day and who carried the dead bodies to and from an army vehicle more than once. Forensic tests carried out later by Channel 4 employed the exact methodology adopted by the Widgery scientists. The results obtained led a forensic expert to state that, with regard to the provenance of firearm discharge material, "Lord Widgery's conclusions must be viewed as being suspect".

Lead particles from the left hand of James Wray, experts agreed, were "consistent with his having used a firearm", although Widgery did not find he was shot while in possession of a weapon. The Saville Inquiry later found "no acceptable scientific evidence to suggest that Jim Wray discharged a firearm on Bloody Sunday, or that he was near anyone else who fired". Wray was also right handed, while the presence of lead particles may be explicable by working in a factory where solder was often used. Firearm contamination alleged to have come from victim William Nash was found on his right hand, whereas the young man was left-handed.

The printed report ran to 60 pages and cost 36½p.

== Political and public reaction ==
On 19 April 1972, Heath informed the Commons that Lord Widgery's report had been received by the government; he summarised the main findings. A significant part of the ensuing debate, in which each main opposition party leader spoke, addressed Widgery having focused on the dangers of abandoning a "low-key" military approach. Jim Callaghan said that Widgery was correct to identify a change in this policy as critical for what took place on the day. Jeremy Thorpe accepted that soldiers had to deal with an illegal march and significant provocation but felt that the "most disquieting single finding of the report is that 13 people died, none of whom was proved to have been in possession of weapons at the time, and some of whom are completely acquitted of complicity".

Conservative and unionist representatives welcomed the report and highlighted that Widgery had vindicated the British Army. Nationalist MP Frank McManus was scathing towards the report. The only thing it would achieve was "finally to bankrupt any shred of confidence the minority ever had in tribunals or judicial inquiries set up by … this Government. In their eyes it is plainly a spurious and desperate attempt to whitewash the activities of the Army on that Sunday". He further asked Heath if he would ensure that the international community did not get the impression that the British government shared Widgery's view that without a march 13 deaths would not have happened on that day.

In accepting the report on behalf of the British government, defence secretary Lord Carrington noted that "some awful things" had been said about the conduct of troops on 30 January 1972 but that the British Army had come out of Widgery's report "very well indeed" and had "nothing to be ashamed of", even if some mistakes were indeed made.

The British press reported on 19 and 20 April that Widgery had exonerated the troops, who had not overreacted on 30 January of that year.

Unionist MP for Derry, Albert Anderson, disagreed with the use of "whitewash" with regard to the Widgery Tribunal and regarded the report as "the reasonable conclusions of a very highly qualified lawyer". Local nationalist politicians Ivan Cooper, Eddie McAteer and John Hume, the latter calling on Widgery to resign, expressed little surprise at the tribunal's findings but stressed the major political difficulties it would create. The goodwill engendered among nationalists by the suspension of the Stormont Parliament on 28 March 1972 all but disappeared with the release of the Widgery Report.

Irish Taoiseach Jack Lynch said it was hard to understand how Lord Widgery had made the findings in his report based on the evidence presented to him and called again for an international judicial inquiry into Bloody Sunday.

Bishop Edward Daly, eyewitness to several deaths on Bloody Sunday, was disappointed by the way the tribunal was handled and thought Widgery biased. "What really made Bloody Sunday so obscene was the fact that people afterwards, at the highest level of British justice, justified it", he said, adding that Widgery was the "second atrocity".

Playwright Brian Friel, who had been on the march on 30 January, created The Freedom of the City, a play written while Widgery was sitting and finished a month after he reported. The plot is prefaced by an anonymous judge inquiring into fictitious deaths in Derry.

When the coroner at the 1973 inquests into Bloody Sunday accused the British Army of "sheer, unadulterated murder", those who believed that Lord Widgery had reached the wrong conclusions found those beliefs to be stronger.

American academic Samuel Dash accused Widgery of "denying justice" to the victims of Bloody Sunday.

It was felt that the tribunal had fulfilled its task with "undue … expedition". Widgery had also been a senior army officer to whom the military could feel "fortunate" in having someone "who understood soldiers well and sympathised with them in difficult situations in which they were placed".

In his 1983 book, Raymond McClean felt "appalled at the contents of this so-called judicial enquiry". Among its inconsistencies was having found no conclusive evidence that any of those killed or injured had a firearm in his hands when shot, while concluding that the soldiers of 1 Para had been shot at before firing back.

Lord Saville later observed: "In Lord Widgery's inquiry, the families were given very limited legal representation, and those legal representatives were given very few of the relevant papers, and that was a cause of huge disquiet among the families".

== Pressure for a new inquiry ==
The families of the victims always maintained that Widgery was a whitewash: "For those bereaved on Bloody Sunday, the hasty judicial inquiry conducted in its aftermath deepened their wounds and left them festering for decades". Grievances with Widgery's findings in Northern Ireland lingered and the report remained contentious as the Northern Ireland peace process advanced in the 1990s.

John Hume urged the British government in 1992 to set up a new inquiry. Responding, prime minister John Major confirmed, as had been stated in 1974, that no suspicion could be attached to the victims on Bloody Sunday for having been shot while in possession of explosives or firearms.

In 1995, minutes of a meeting between Widgery and Heath at No. 10 on 31 January 1972 were discovered. The judge had been advised by Heath not to forget that in Northern Ireland the British government was waging "not only a military war but a propaganda war". Heath later claimed that there was "nothing sinister" in this warning to the judge and that Widgery's inquiry was not biased. "Anyone who knew Widgery", he said, "would confirm his integrity was beyond doubt of [sic.] question". Widgery's report, Heath stated, showed that he had acted with "strict and impartial determination" and had received no "steer"; nor would he have accepted one. The reason Heath gave for mentioning the propaganda issue was not to exert influence over Widgery but to make it clear that "the inquiry would attract media attention and publicity and he would find himself in the middle of it".

In early 1997, Eyewitness Bloody Sunday, a book by Don Mullan who had been on the civil rights march, led Channel 4 to commission a new documentary on Bloody Sunday and gave a significant boost to calls by the victims' families for justice.

The Bloody Sunday Trust was formed in 1997. It commissioned a report by a law professor, Dermot Walsh, to investigate statements made by British soldiers late on the evening of Bloody Sunday and their evidence later given to the Widgery Tribunal. Walsh found that evidence "fundamentally flawed" and argued that by reaching conclusions premised so strongly on the integrity of the soldiers, Widgery had ignored discrepancies and undermined many of his findings. It was also noted that soldiers’ evidence was not made available to the representatives of the families of the dead and wounded and had never been tested in open court.

In the House of Commons on 29 January 1998 prime minister Tony Blair said that the timescale within which Lord Widgery produced his report (11 weeks) meant that he was unable to consider all possible evidence. With new material uncovered – eye-witness accounts, reinterpretation of ballistic material and medical evidence – much of it presented to the government by the Irish government and victims' families, he announced a full-scale judicial inquiry to maintain public confidence. He noted that Lord Saville, a Law Lord, would chair a tribunal of three people, likely from Commonwealth nations. Widgery's terms of reference applied also to this "matter of urgent public importance", other than for the addition of "taking account of any new information relevant to events on that day".

At the opening of the Bloody Sunday Inquiry, the families reiterated their belief that the Widgery Tribunal was unfair and corrupt. Widgery, they argued, "had negotiated the terms of his appointment … in such a way as to exclude any possibility of investigating the involvement of anyone at a political level in the events that led to Bloody Sunday. By confining his areas of inquiry to the few minutes when men were shot and killed, Lord Widgery had assisted those who were politically responsible". The families' barrister also accused the British government of overseeing a cover-up in the form of Widgery's "public impartial investigation".

While a transcript of all oral hearings and written evidence from Widgery was available to Lord Saville, he declined to comment publicly at that time on the Widgery Report itself. Rather, he emphasised, he was chairing a judicial inquiry into Bloody Sunday and not a review of the Widgery Tribunal.

The Bloody Sunday Inquiry lasted 12 years before the Saville Report was published on 15 June 2010. Saville overturned the conclusions reached by the Widgery Tribunal: soldiers involved in Bloody Sunday had told lies about their actions and claims that they had come under fire were false. The Daily Telegraph said the Saville Report had "turned the Widgery report on its head by exonerating the victims and delivering a damning account of the conduct of soldiers".

Several months after the publication of his report, Lord Saville warned a committee of the House of Commons of the pitfalls of rushing any public inquiry: "A thorough, proper, fair inquiry ... is going to cost a large sum of money and take a very long time. Lord Widgery was asked to do an inquiry quickly, and if I may say so, boy, did he come unstuck".

On the same day prime minister David Cameron apologised in the House of Commons for the "unjustified and unjustifiable" events of Bloody Sunday. In Derry relatives of the victims of that day tore through a large banner symbolising the Widgery Report; later, copies of the Widgery Report were torn up outside the Guildhall. Tony Doherty of the Bloody Sunday families said they had been waiting since 30 January 1972 to hear the words 'unjustified and unjustifiable': "Widgery's great lie has been laid bare", he added.

The findings of the Widgery Tribunal are often regarded as discredited.
