= Theodore Frelinghuysen Jewell =

Rear admiral of the United States Navy

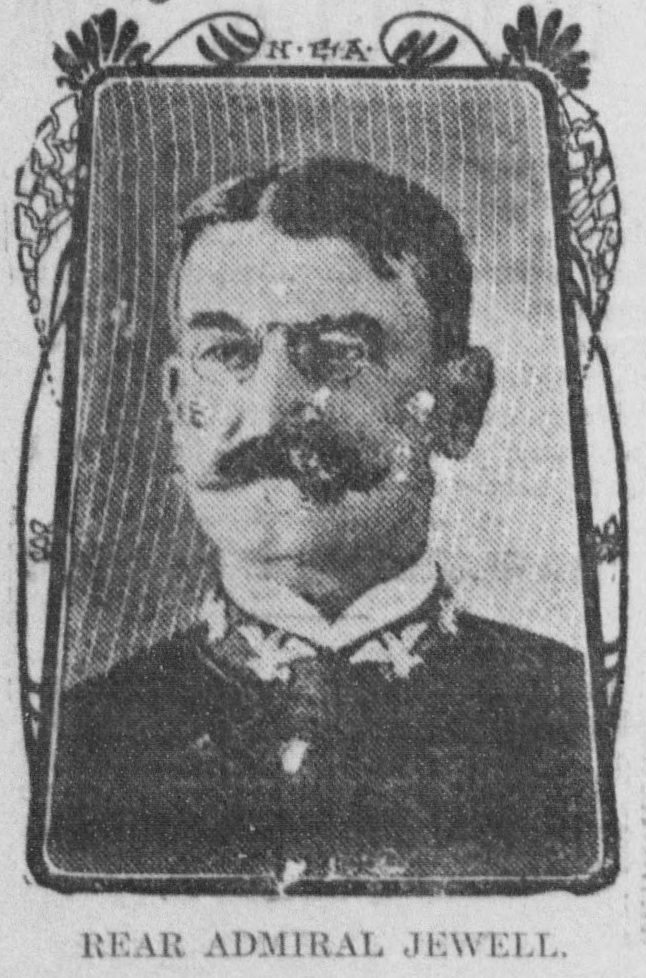
- Jewell circa 1904
- Born: August 5, 1844; Washington, D.C., US
- Died: July 26, 1932 (aged 87); Washington, D.C., US
- Burial place: Arlington National Cemetery
- Military career
- Allegiance: United States United States of America; Union
- Branch: United States Navy
- Service years: 1861–1904
- Rank: Rear admiral
- Commands: USS Essex; USS Marblehead; USS Minneapolis; USS Columbia; USS Brooklyn; USS Olympia
- Conflicts: American Civil War; Oahu Expedition; Honolulu Courthouse Riot; Spanish–American War; Battle of Manila Bay

Theodore Frelinghuysen Jewell (August 5, 1844 – July 26, 1932) was a rear admiral of the United States Navy.

== Naval career ==
Jewell was appointed an acting midshipman on November 29, 1861, when he entered the United States Naval Academy. His class of 1865 graduated early on November 22, 1864. He served on the USS Colorado, at the Naval Observatory in Washington, D.C., and at the U.S. Naval Academy. During the Civil War while still at the Naval Academy, in the summer of 1863 when the nation's capital was threatened by General Robert E. Lee's forces, he was in command of a fleet of howitzers at the US Naval Yard for the defense of Washington, D.C.

Jewell was involved in peacekeeping activities from the Tuscarora in Seoul, Korea, Panama in 1872, and Hawaii in 1874, during the election of King Kalākaua, to negotiate the duty-free exportation of sugar to the United States. A riot occurred on election day and marines and sailors from the Tuscarora and the USS Portsmouth landed to restore order.

In 1879 he was executive officer of the frigate Constitution. From January 1893 to February 1896 he was superintendent of the Naval Gun Factory at the Washington Navy Yard.

Jewell served with Admiral Dewey at the Battle of Manila Bay and later commanded the European squadron of the American Fleet in March 1904 when he was made a rear admiral. He retired in November 1904.

== Dates of rank ==
- Midshipman: July 16, 1862
- Ensign: November 1, 1866
- Lieutenant: March 12, 1868
- Lieutenant Commander: March 26, 1869
- Commander: January 26, 1885
- Captain: February 1, 1898
- Rear Admiral: March 15, 1904

== Personal life ==
He was the son of Thomas and Eleanor (Spencer) Jewell, born in Washington, D.C., on August 5, 1844. On June 15, 1871, he married Elizabeth Lindsay Poor, daughter of rear admiral Charles Henry Poor. They had one son Commander Charles T. Jewell (1872–1929).

Admiral Jewell died July 26, 1932, at his residence in Washington, D.C. He was buried in Arlington National Cemetery.

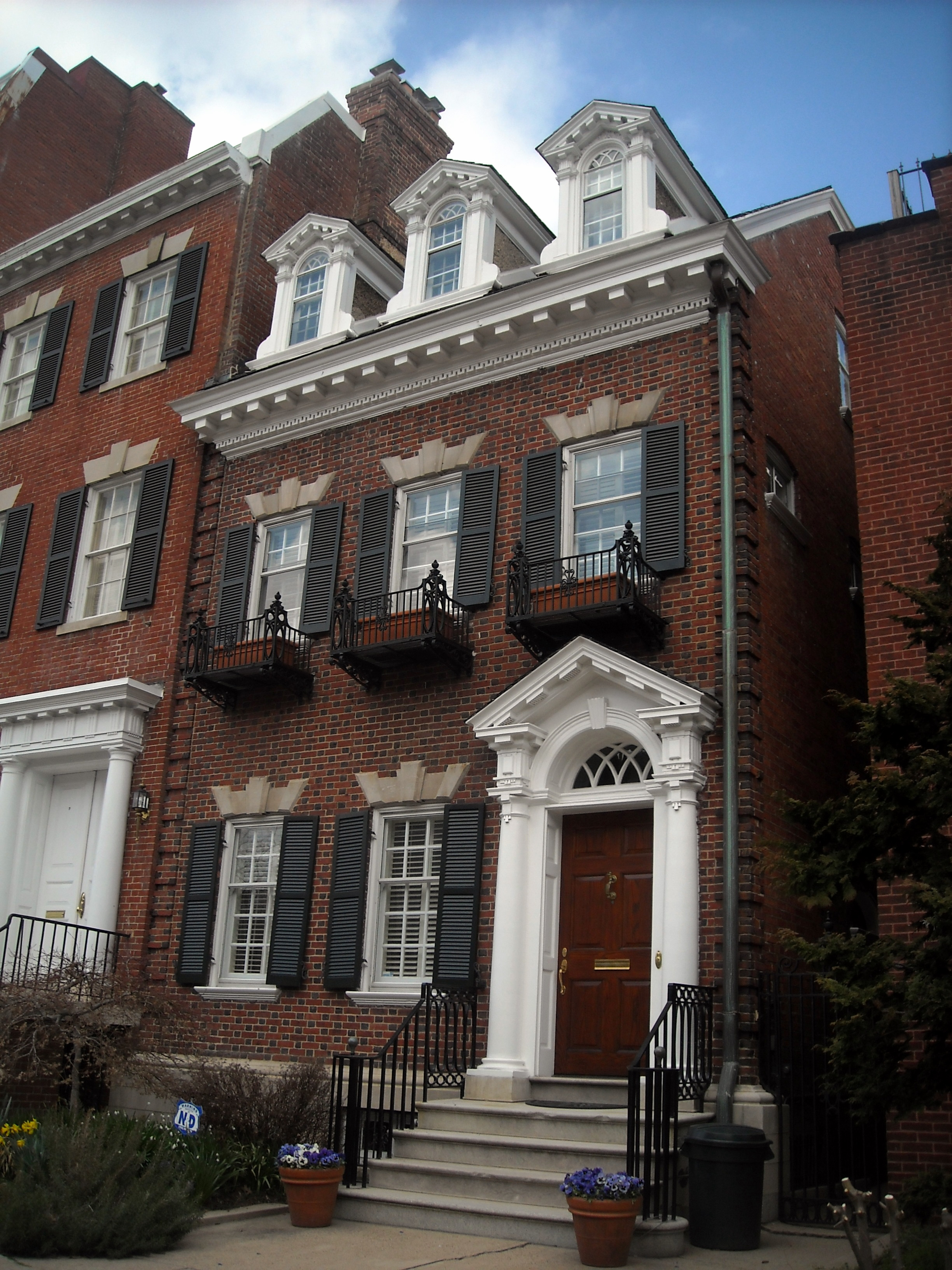
Captain Theodore Jewell House in Washington, D.C.

== Gallery ==
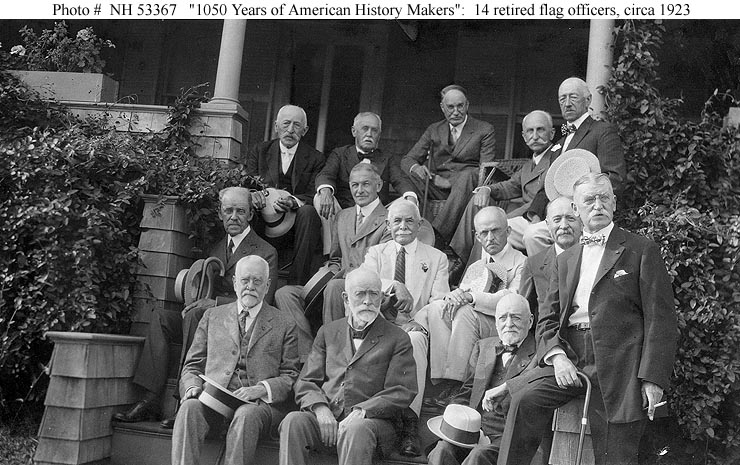
Jewell is on the right in the front row in this photograph of 13 retired U.S. Navy and U.S. Marine Corps flag officers taken c. 1923.

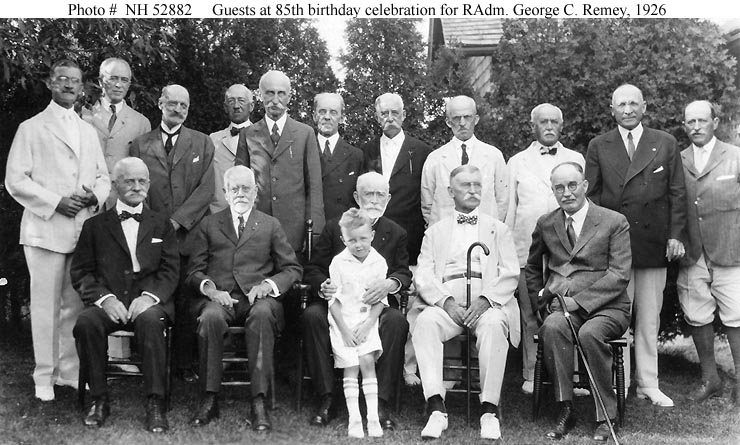
Jewell is seated second from the right in this photo of retired flag officers taken at the 85th birthday party of Rear Admiral George C. Remey on August 10, 1926.
