= Honolulu Courthouse =

Demolished building in Hawaii

- Hale Kauila; Ka Hale Aupuni Kahiko
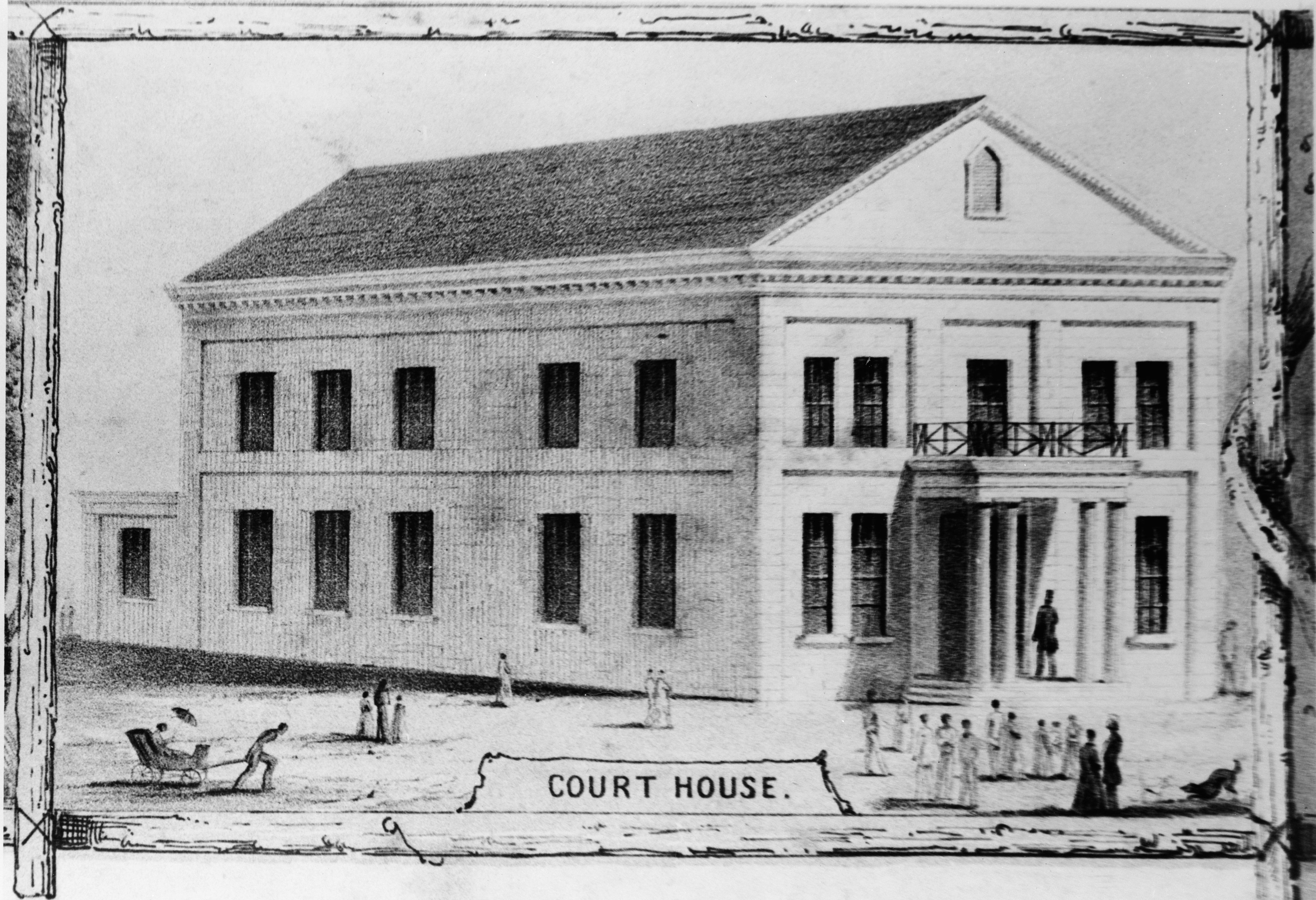
- Litograph by Paul Emmert depicting the Honolulu Court House as it appeared in 1853
- Former names: Court House; Parliament House
- Alternative names: Old Courthouse

General information
- Status: Demolished
- Type: Courthouse
- Location: Honolulu, Hawaii
- Coordinates: 21°18′30″N 157°51′49″W
- Construction started: 1851
- Opened: 1852
- Renovated: 1874
- Demolished: 1968
- Cost: $34,229.50

Dimensions
- Other dimensions: 56 ft × 75 ft (17 m × 23 m) (as built); 56 ft × 107 ft (17 m × 33 m) (after renovation)

Technical details
- Material: Coral blocks

Design and construction
- Main contractor: C.W. Vincent

The Honolulu Courthouse (also known as simply the Court House or the Parliament House, and later known as the Old Courthouse) was a two-story building in Downtown Honolulu, Hawaii. It served as the meeting location of the Hawaiian Kingdom's Legislature and Supreme Court between 1852 and 1874. It was also the site of the Legislature's elections of William Lunalilo and David Kalākaua as king in 1873 and 1874, respectively. A riot that broke out following the election of Kalākaua caused significant damage to the building and its contents. The Legislature and Judiciary moved out of the Honolulu Courthouse in 1874, and the building was sold to H. Hackfeld and Company (later renamed Amfac), which used the building for office and warehouse space until it was demolished in 1968 to make room for a new office complex.

== Background ==
King Kamehameha III and his Kuhina Nui, Kekāuluohi, promulgated the Hawaiian Kingdom's first written constitution in 1840, which formally established the Kingdom's Supreme Court and Legislature. In September 1847, the legislature passed a law formally organizing the Kingdom's Judiciary Department.

Prior to the construction of the Courthouse, the kingdom's highest court, known at that time as the "Superior Court", met in a government building located between Fort Street and Garden Lane in downtown Honolulu, near the Cathedral Basilica of Our Lady of Peace. The newspaper The Polynesian commented that this building was inadequate for the court, being "intolerably stuffy" and having conditions that made it difficult to find people willing to serve as jurors. The newspaper also noted that the court building's wood construction did not provide adequate protection for the court's important records and documents.

The Privy Council examined the possible relocation of the court between 1845 through 1851, looking at various locations in Honolulu. On May 20, 1850, a committee of privy councilors tasked with examining the issue recommended the construction of a new building that included both a courthouse and a new jail. However, due to difficulties in finding a suitable site, the Privy Council ultimately recommended to build the courthouse and jail separately, and proceeded with the construction of a new courthouse that could also provide a meeting location for the kingdom's legislature.

== Design and construction ==
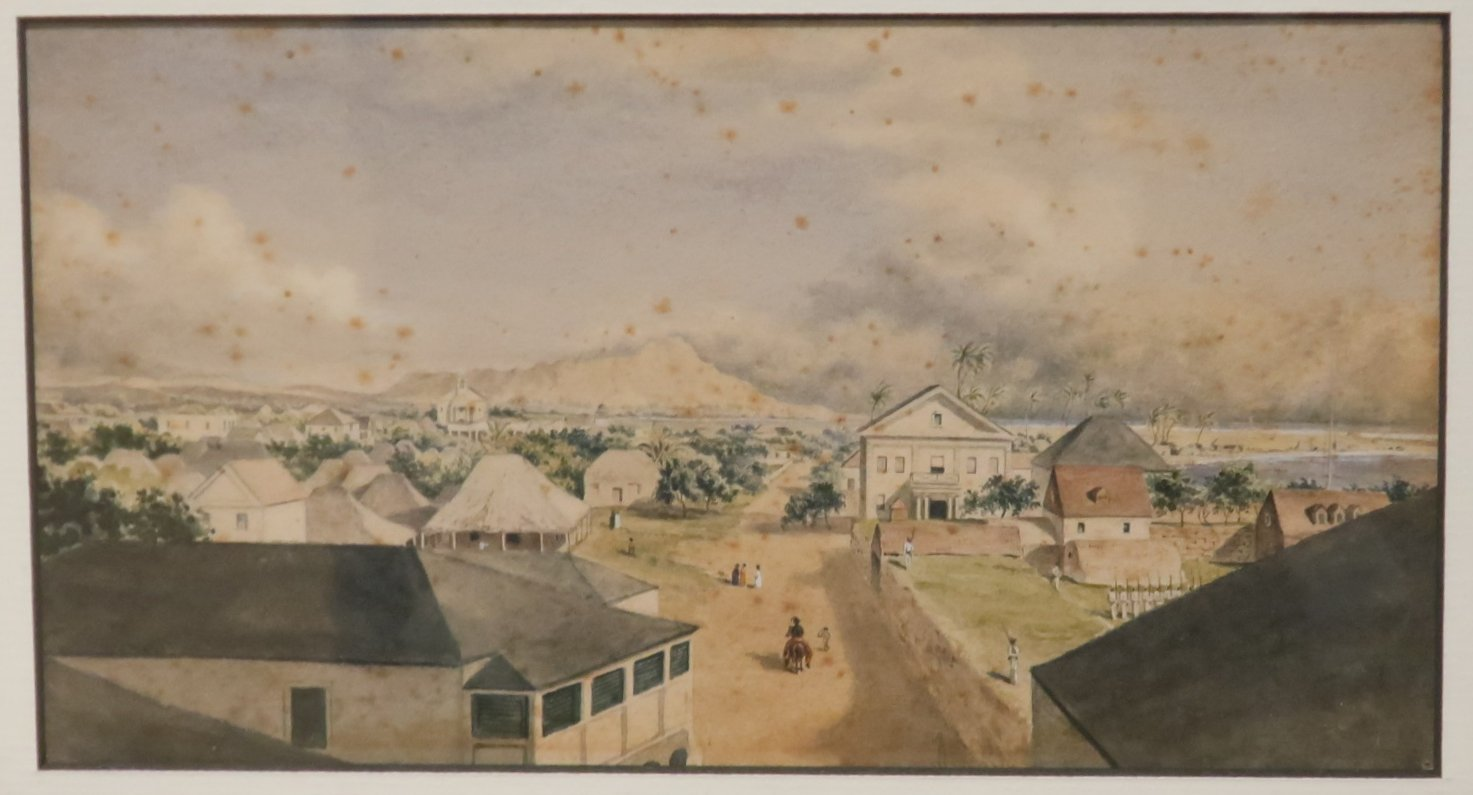
Watercolor painting of Queen Street, Honolulu in 1856. The Honolulu Courthouse is the white two-story building at right. Fort Kekuanohu is within the walled-off grounds in front of the courthouse.

The site selected for the courthouse was along Queen Street near that road's intersection with Fort Street. The site was just south of Fort Kekuanohu (also known as Fort Honolulu), which at the time also served as the city's jailhouse and police headquarters. Construction commenced sometime in 1851.

The construction utilized prison laborers, which brought about challenges. In October 1851, a group of about forty prisoners working on the project overpowered the guards who were supervising them, took possession of gun batteries overlooking the city, and attempted to open fire on nearby buildings. However, the prisoners lacked fire to set off the guns, and police officers were able to quell the disturbance. The use of prison laborers also apparently led to delays and cost overruns. On April 14, 1852, the Minister of the Interior reported to the legislature that although the courthouse was "nearly completed," the project was facing a delay due to the "miserable quality of the laborers employed, who have been, principally, the prisoners." The minister noted that due to these delays, an additional appropriation would be required to complete the building. In a review of the kingdom's financial records, historian Richard Greer estimated that the cost of the courthouse was $34,229.50, which he described as a "very considerable sum for that time, and one which apparently justified the minister of the interior's strictures."

According to state statistician Robert C. Schmitt, the Courthouse probably had the first flush toilets in the Hawaiian Kingdom.

== Government building: 1852–1874 ==
The Superior Court held its first session at the new courthouse on July 5, 1852. Before beginning the session, Chief Justice William Little Lee dedicated the new building, the modern nature of which he contrasted with the thatched huts that the judiciary had used for hearings just a few years prior:

Justice in a grass house is as precious as justice in one of coral, but no one can fail to agree with me, that the latter with all its comforts and conveniences is greatly to be preferred, inasmuch as it tends to promote that dignity and propriety of manners so essential to secure a proper respect for the law and its administration. May this Hall ever be the temple of Justice—may its walls ever echo with the accents of truth—may its high roof ever look down upon us in the faithful discharge of our duties—and may the blessing of Him who builded the Heavens and whose throne is the fountain of all justice ever rest upon us.

— Chief Justice William Little Lee

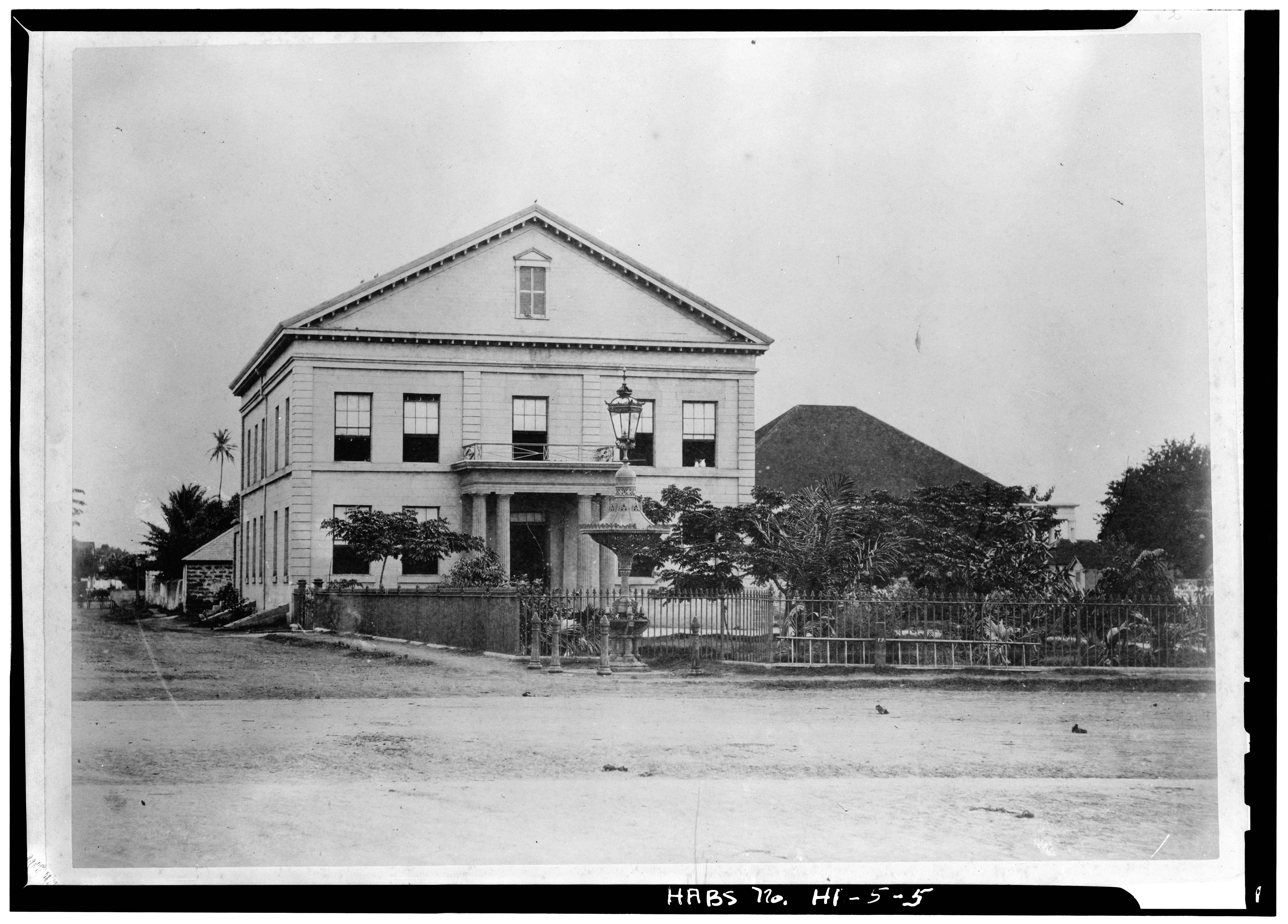
Photograph of the northwest front of the Honolulu Courthouse, circa 1872.

As completed, the courthouse was two stories tall, with dimensions of 56 feet (17 m) by 75 feet (23 m), with a one-story classical-style portico at the building's entrance. The second story of the building did not extend through the entire building as the Superior Court's courtroom was a full two stories tall, measuring 30 feet (9.1 m) from floor to ceiling. This changed in 1853, when $1,200 was appropriated to extend the second story of the building over the courtroom to provide additional accommodations for the Legislature, though the space ended up being used by the Supreme Court, which superseded the Superior Court as the highest court in the kingdom. During the same decade, additional space was set aside to safeguard the records of the registrar of conveyances and a portion of the basement was converted into storage space for the collector of customs.

Because the building also served as a meeting location for the kingdom's legislature, it was also called "Parliament House" and acted as the kingdom's capitol building. The hall in which the legislature met included a throne, overlain with an ʻahu ʻula, from which the king would open each legislative session.

In addition to these government functions, the building also served as a gathering space for a variety of private and community activities, including meetings, concerts, plain and fancy dress balls, and church services. Notably, the courthouse hosted a ball to celebrate the wedding of King Kamehameha IV to Emma Rooke, who became Queen Emma. The courthouse was also the location where Queen's Hospital, named after Queen Emma, was formally established on May 25, 1859, during a meeting of its subscribers, presided over by King Kamehameha IV.

=== 1873 and 1874 elections and the 1874 courthouse riot ===
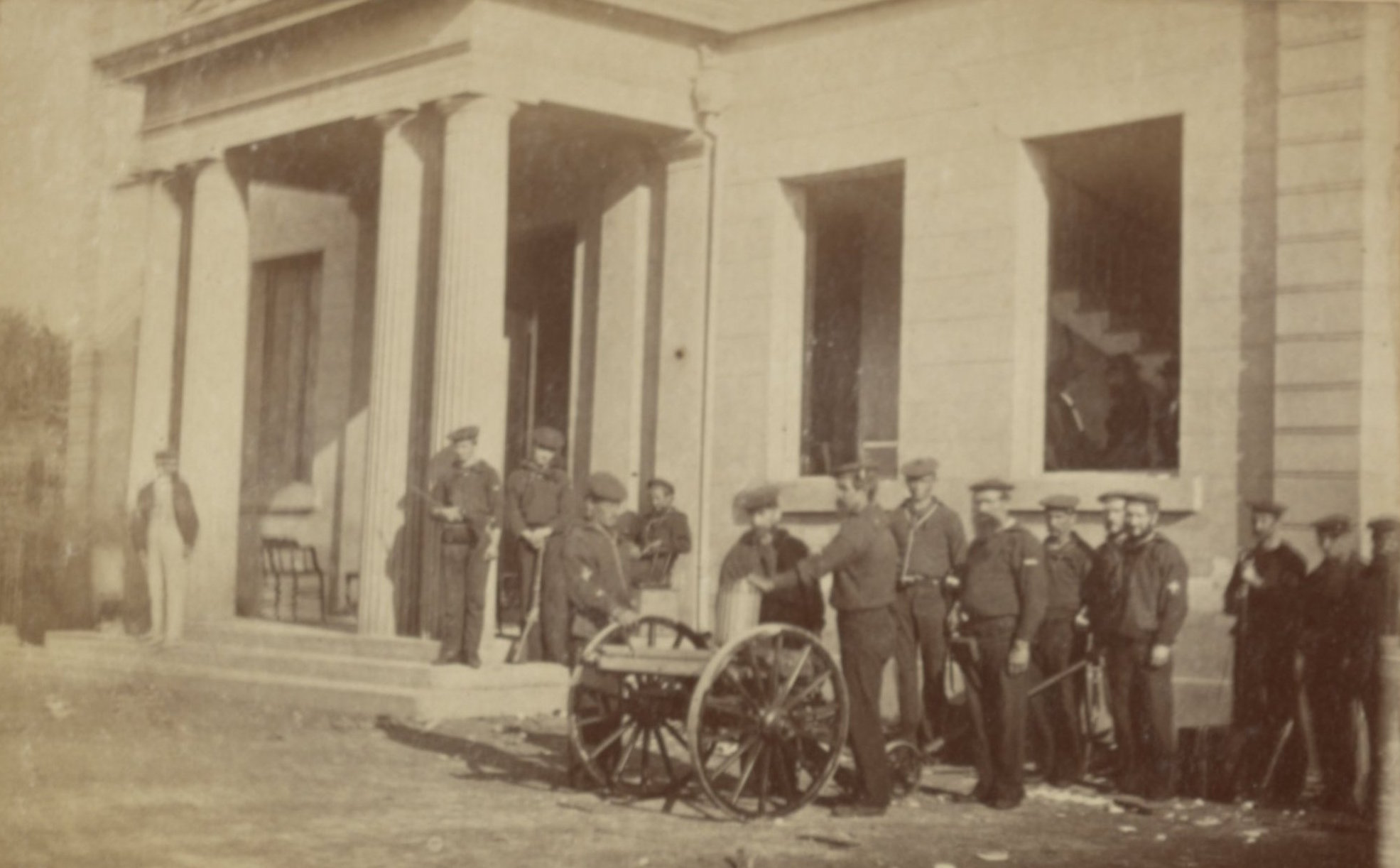
Gatling guns and soldiers in front of the Honolulu Courthouse during the riot that followed the election of David Kalākaua as king in 1874.

When King Kamehameha V died on December 11, 1872, without naming an heir, the kingdom's constitution provided that the selection of a new monarch fell to the kingdom's legislature. As the meeting location of the legislature, the legislature convened on January 8, 1873, at the courthouse to elect William Charles Lunalilo as the new king.

Following Lunalilo's death on February 3, 1874, the legislature convened again at the courthouse on February 12, 1874, to elect a new monarch. Two candidates stood in the election: David Kalākaua, who had also stood in the 1873 election, and Queen Emma, the widow of King Kamehameha IV. After the legislature elected Kalākaua by a vote of 39 to 6, an angry mob of Queen Emma's supporters forced their way into the courthouse, attacked members of the legislature, and ransacked the building and its furnishings. Many books in the judiciary's law library and many valuable government records were lost in the riot. The riot badly damaged the courthouse, and while some sources report that the building was at least partially repaired, other sources state that the government chose to sell the building in lieu of repairing the damage.

=== Government functions move to Aliʻiōlani Hale ===
By the 1860s, the growing size of the kingdom's government created an increased demand for office space. Government offices were spread out across a number of government-owned buildings, including the courthouse, as well as a number of rented offices throughout Honolulu. As the amount of money being spent on rent increased, the Privy Council began to again discuss the construction of a new government building to consolidate the kingdom's offices. In 1872, the kingdom laid the cornerstone of what would eventually become Aliʻiōlani Hale. Construction of the building was completed in 1874. The legislature moved out of the Honolulu Courthouse and into Aliʻiōlani Hale on April 30, 1874, and the Supreme Court followed on May 27 of the same year.

== Ownership by H. Hackfeld and Company and its successors: 1874–1968 ==
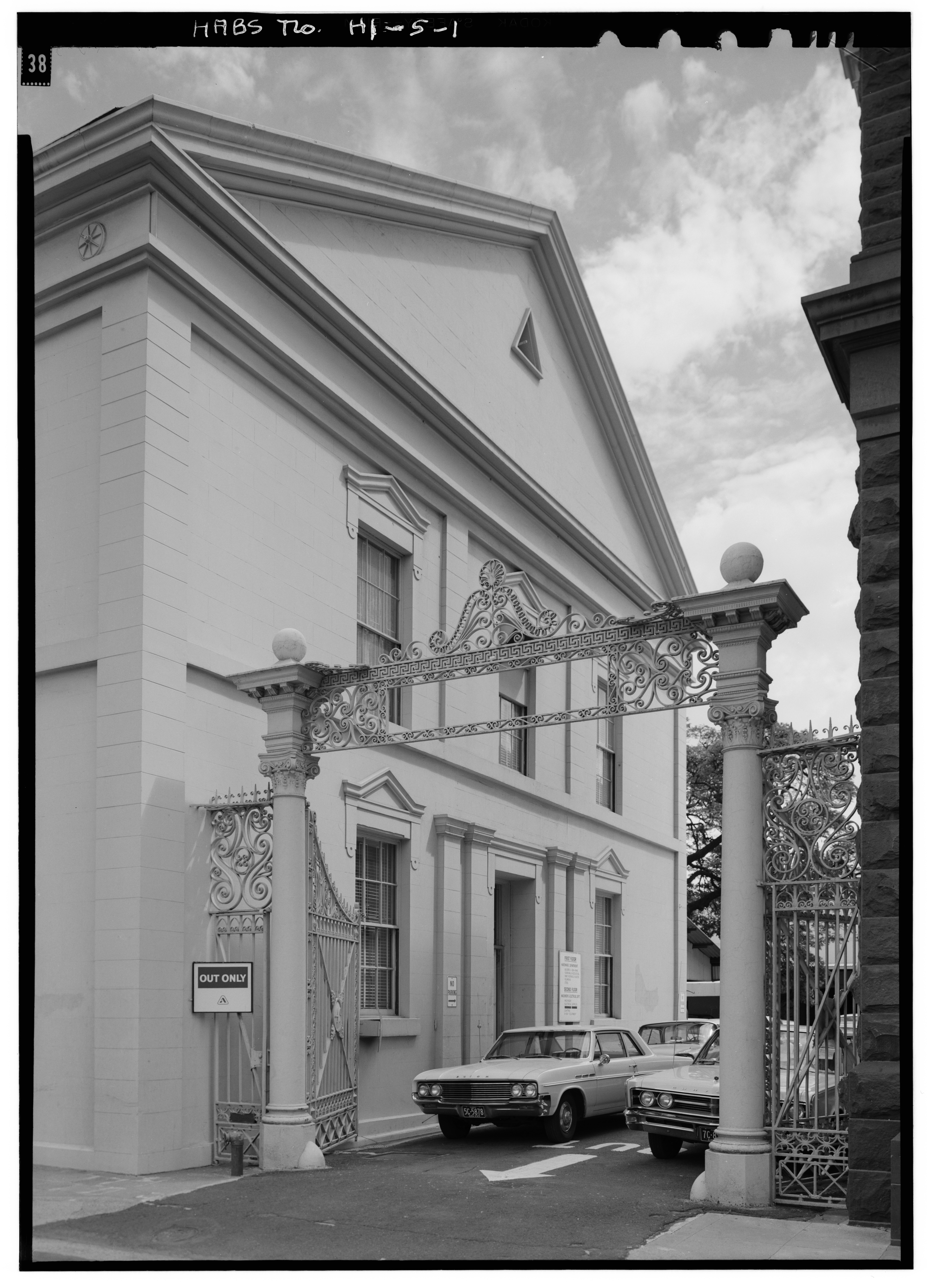
Northwest front of the Old Courthouse as renovated by H. Hackfeld and Company. Note the removal of the portico and the addition of a cast- and wrought-iron gateway. A portion of the company's headquarters is visible to the right of the gate.

After the legislature and judiciary moved out of the Old Courthouse, the Hawaiian Kingdom put the building up for sale. On September 19, 1874, the building was purchased at auction by H. Hackfeld and Company for $20,000, the auction's upset price.

Upon taking possession of the building, H. Hackfeld and Company gutted and rebuilt the building's interior to serve as the company's headquarters. The company also used the building as a warehouse for groceries and feed and as a steamship agent's office. Between 1885 and 1891, a new addition was added to the rear of the building. In 1899, H. Hackfeld and Company constructed a new building next door to the Old Courthouse to serve as its new headquarters and erected a cast- and wrought-iron gateway between the Old two buildings. Each half of the gate bore medallions with the left gate bearing the number "49," representing the year the company was founded (1849), and the right gate bearing the number "99," representing the year the company celebrated its fiftieth anniversary (1899). At around the same time the gate was erected, the company removed the building's front portico.

Although H. Hackfeld and Company moved into the new headquarters next door in 1903, the company, and its successors continued to use the Old Courthouse for office and warehouse space until 1968.

== Demolition ==
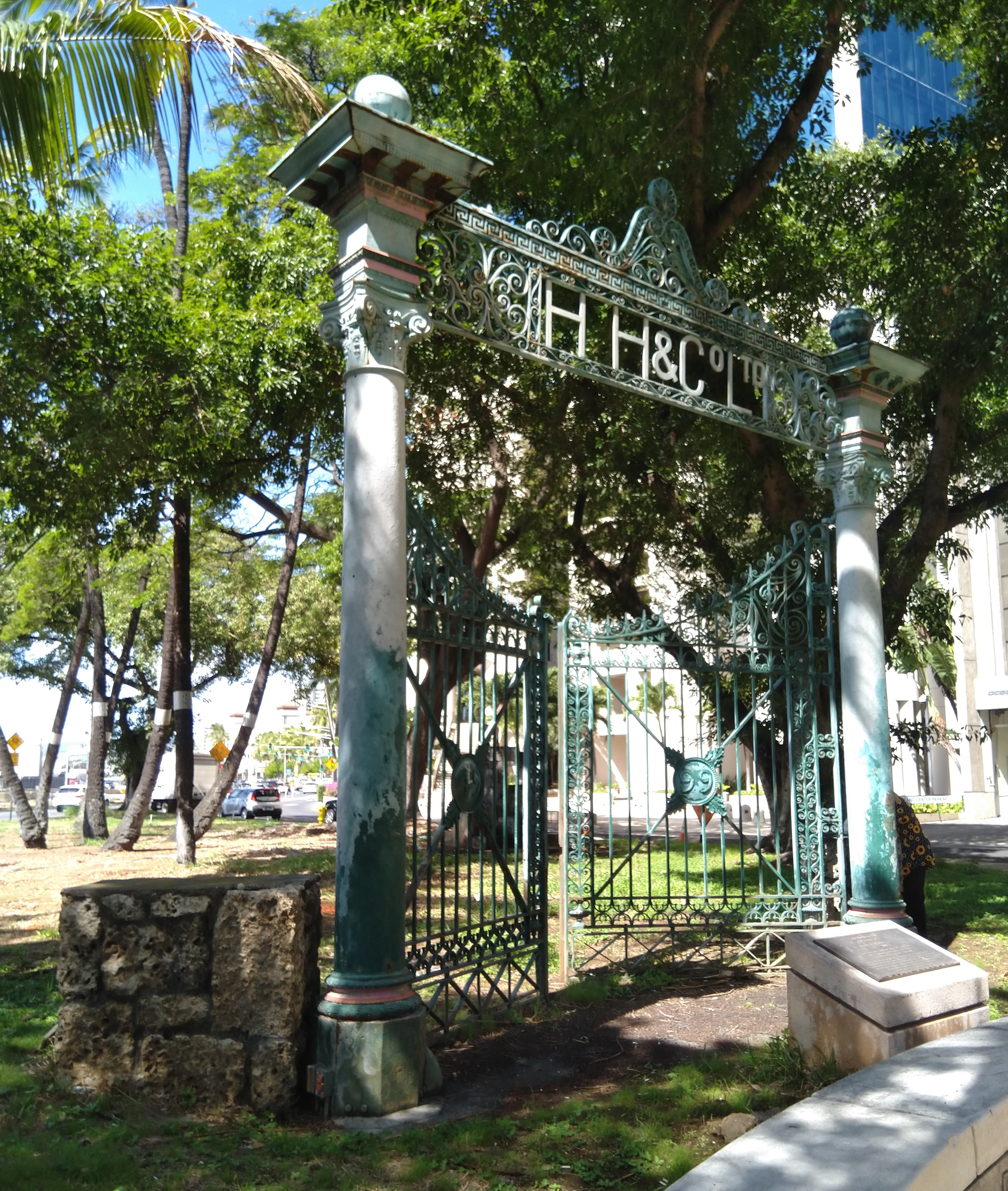
The cast- and wrought-iron gateway and coral blocks from the Old Courthouse on display at Walker Park in Honolulu.

In February 1968, Amfac announced plans to demolish the Old Courthouse to make way for a new high-rise office complex. Although Amfac indicated the building could not stay at its current location, it stated it would be willing to donate the Old Courthouse and provide up to $25,000 to dismantle and reconstruct it at another location.

After the announcement, there was movement among preservationists to try to preserve the building. In March 1968, the State of Hawaii's Historic Buildings Task Force proposed that Amfac swap the 25,000 square foot parcel on which the courthouse stood with an adjacent 21,000 square foot parcel, which was owned by the City and County of Honolulu and used as a park. Under this proposed deal, the courthouse would be preserved at its existing location. The deal also gave Amfac the right to develop the area above Fort Street Mall, a pedestrian mall that separated the city park from the land on which the company's 1903 headquarters stood. However, Amfac stated that it had previously considered such a land swap and decided not to pursue it because it would "destroy the effectiveness of the Fort Street Mall." In addition to the proposal from the task force, the state government also studied the feasibility of moving the Old Courthouse building to the Honolulu Civic Center. The State's comptroller noted that ʻIolani Barracks had been moved, brick by brick, in a similar fashion to the grounds of ʻIolani Palace at a cost of $250,000.

Despite the interest in saving the building, Amfac announced in December 1968 that no organization had submitted a plan to take possession of the Old Courthouse and the company commenced with the demolition of the building on December 28, 1968. However, Amfac also announced that it would preserve some of the coral blocks that made up the building's structure and would donate the blocks to the state's Historic Buildings Task Force. Amfac also preserved stone blocks that made up the sidewalk adjacent to the courthouse, which had been constructed from ballast brought to Hawaii on sailing ships. At the time of the Old Courthouse's demolition, it was the oldest government building standing in Honolulu.

Several artifacts from the Old Courthouse are displayed at Walker Park, a small park next to the office complex that was constructed at the site of the courthouse, including two coral blocks used in the building's construction and the cast- and wrought-iron gateway that stood next to the courthouse.
