= Old Courthouse, Ripon =

Building in Ripon, North Yorkshire, England

Coordinates: 54°08′07″N 1°31′17″W

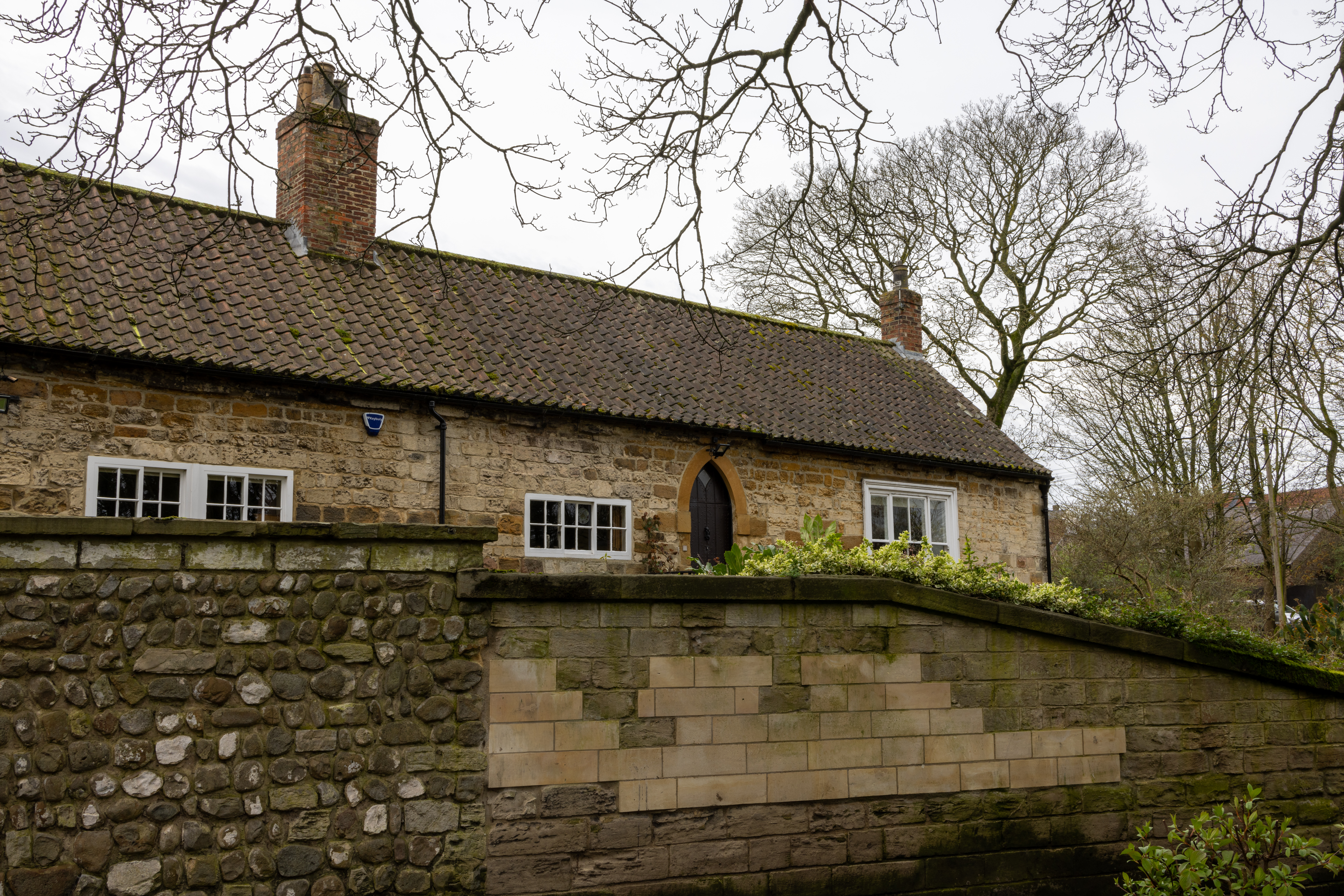
The building, in 2024

The Old Courthouse is a historic building in Ripon, a city in North Yorkshire, in England.

The building may be 14th century, although no dateable features have survived. It is possible that it reuses some materials from a former palace of the Archbishop of York. It was used as the courthouse of the Liberty of Ripon. It was later extended to the south, the extension perhaps incorporating an existing timber-framed kitchen block. By the 17th century, its ground floor was used as a gaol, and in the early 19th century it may have been a debtor's prison. It was owned by Ripon Cathedral until the 1950s, when it was sold and converted into a private house. The building was grade II listed in 1949.

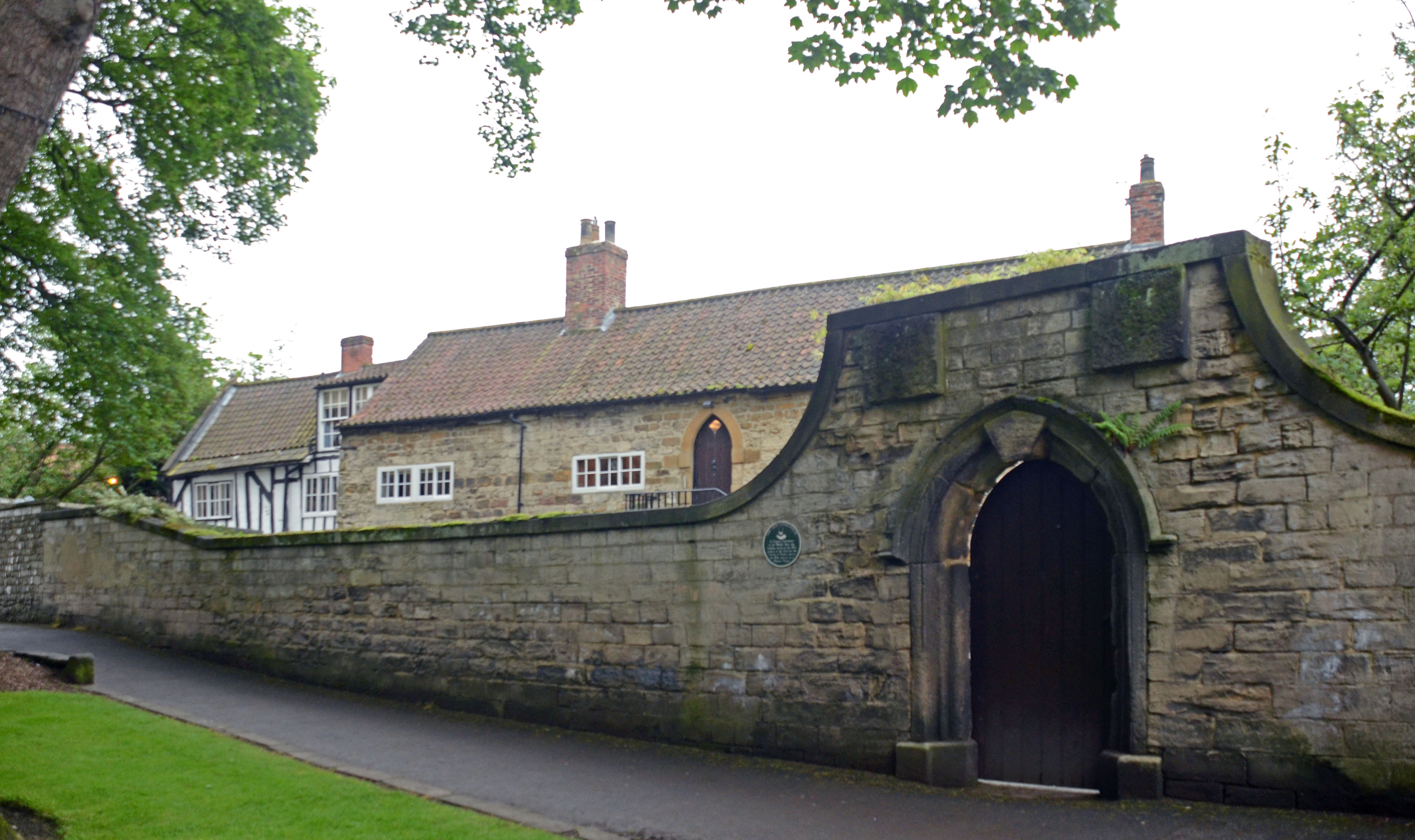
Southern end of the building, showing the timber-framed section

The building is constructed of stone and has sprocketed pantile roofs. There are two storeys, three bays, and a south extension with a timber framed upper floor. The building contains a blocked round-arched doorway, and an arched doorway in the upper floor approached by external steps with an iron balustrade. The windows are a mix of sashes, casements and one slit window. Inside, the former cells have iron-plated ceilings, and two doors studded with iron.

== See also ==
- Listed buildings in Ripon
