= Old Courthouse, Coleraine =

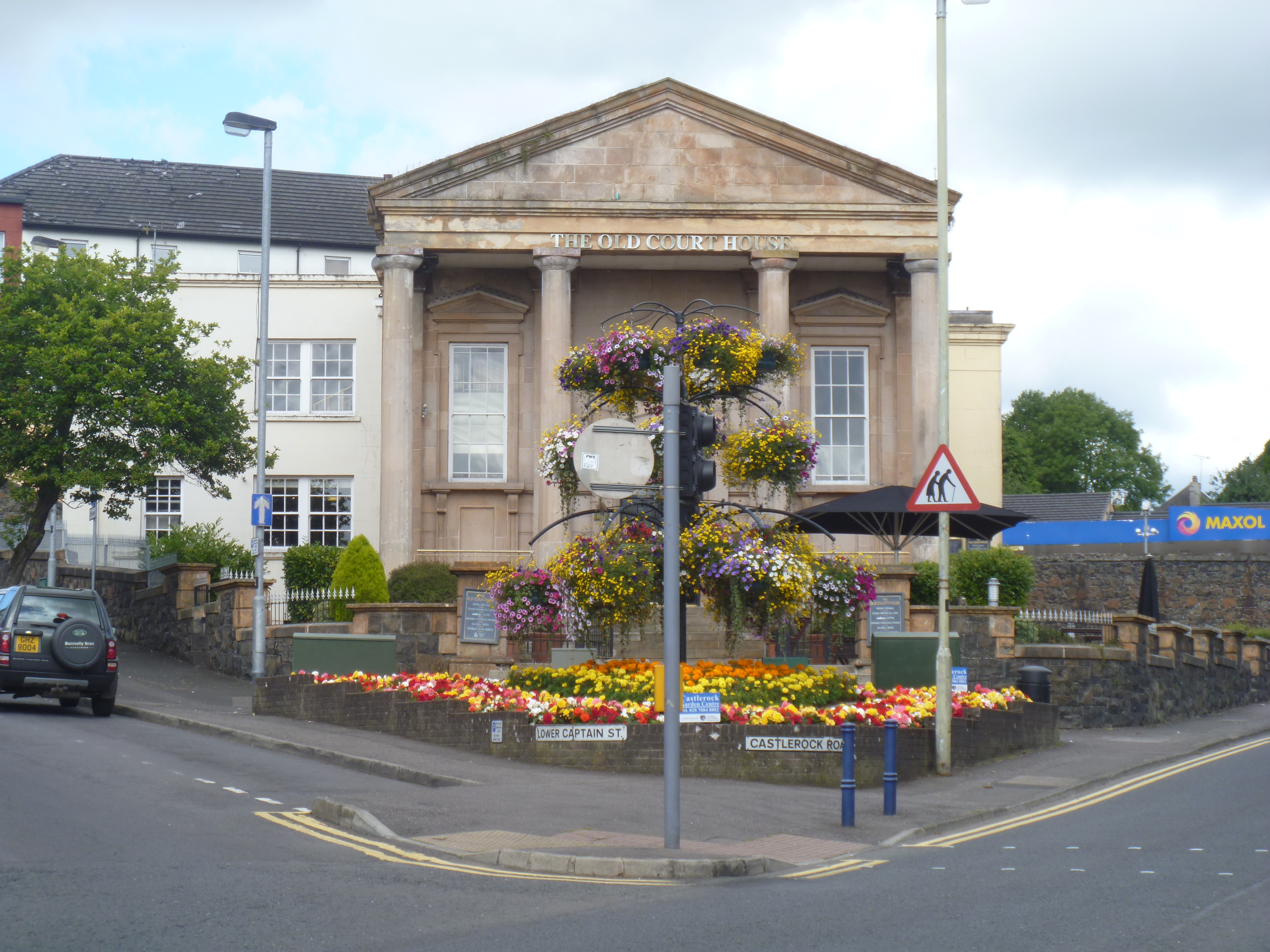
- Old Courthouse, Coleraine

- Shown in Northern Ireland
- 55.1320°N 6.6777°W
- Location: Coleraine, County Londonderry

History
- Built: 1852

Site notes
- Architect: Stewart Gordon
- Architectural style: Neoclassical style

Listed Building – Grade B1
- Official name: Former Courthouse, Castlerock Road, Coleraine
- Designated: 22 June 1977
- Reference no.: HB 03/16/002

The Old Courthouse is a former judicial facility on Castlerock Road in Coleraine, County Londonderry, Northern Ireland. It is a Grade B1 listed building.

== History ==
The foundation stone for the building was laid by a local magistrate, Charles Knox, on 24 November 1850. It was designed by Stewart Gordon in the Neoclassical style, built by Constantine Dornan and was completed in 1852. The design involved a symmetrical main frontage facing the corner of Castlerock Road and Captain Street Lower; the central section featured a tetrastyle portico with Doric order columns supporting a frieze and a pediment. A plaque carved with the date "1852" was carved into the stonework above the doorway. A small bridewell was added in 1859. Rowan observed that "the columns [were] too closely spaced for comfort".

The building was originally used as a facility for dispensing justice but, following the implementation of the Local Government (Ireland) Act 1898, which established county councils in every county, it also became a meeting place for Londonderry County Council. An extensive programme of renovation works was completed in 1908. In the 1960s, county leaders decided that the courthouse was too cramped to accommodate the county council in the context of the county council's increasing administrative responsibilities, especially while the courthouse was still acting as a facility for dispensing justice, and therefore chose to move to County Hall, conveniently located just to the north of the courthouse in Coleraine, in July 1970.

After the judicial functions of the courthouse were transferred to modern facilities in Mountsandel Road, the courthouse on Castlerock Road closed in 1985. It was subsequently left empty and deteriorating until it was acquired by Wetherspoons who converted it for leisure use and re-opened it as a public house on 28 February 2001. After Wetherspoons decided to sell five public houses in the area, it was acquired by the Granny Annie's Group in November 2016. The new owners sought planning consent to extend the premises with the creation of a beer garden in August 2017 but indicated, in September 2019, that the venue would be closed on Mondays and Tuesdays as it was "a quite time of year". The Weatherspoons Chairman, Tim Martin, admitted in December 2019 that it had been a mistake to withdraw from the area.
