= John Widgery, Baron Widgery =

English judge (1911–1981)

The Right Honourable The Lord Widgery OBE TD PC

Lord Chief Justice of England
- In office 20 April 1971 – 14 April 1980
- Preceded by: The Lord Parker of Waddington
- Succeeded by: The Lord Lane

Lord Justice of Appeal
- In office 19 January 1968 – 20 April 1971

Justice of the High Court
- In office 1961–1968

Personal details
- Born: John Passmore Widgery; 24 July 1911 South Molton, Devon, England
- Died: 26 July 1981 (aged 70)
- Education: Queen's College, Taunton
- Known for: Widgery Tribunal

Military service
- Allegiance: United Kingdom
- Branch/service: British Army
- Years of service: 1938–1945
- Rank: Brigadier
- Unit: Royal Engineers (1938–1940); Royal Artillery (1940–1945)
- Battles/wars: Normandy landings
- Awards: Officer of the Order of the British Empire (Military Division); Croix de Guerre (France); Order of Leopold (Belgium)

John Passmore Widgery, Baron Widgery (24 July 1911 – 26 July 1981), was an English judge who served as Lord Chief Justice of England from 1971 to 1980. He is principally noted for presiding over the Widgery Tribunal on the events of Bloody Sunday.

== Early career and war service ==
Widgery came from a North Devon family which had been living in South Molton for many generations. His father, Samuel Widgery (died 1940), was a grocer and house furnisher; his mother Bertha Elizabeth, née Passmore, was Samuel's second wife, belonged to a landowning family (Grilstone, Bishop's Nympton, Devon) and served as a local magistrate. An ancestor had been a gaoler. Widgery attended Queen's College, Taunton, where he became head prefect.

He was admitted as a solicitor in 1933 after serving as an articled clerk, but instead of going into practice, he joined Gibson and Welldon, a well-known firm of law tutors. He was an effective lecturer in the years leading up to World War II while he was also commissioned into the Royal Engineers (Territorial Army) in 1938, having joined as a sapper. As a searchlight officer, in 1940 he transferred to the Royal Artillery. Widgery participated in the Normandy landings. By the end of the war he had been appointed an OBE, awarded the Croix de Guerre (France) and the Order of Leopold (Belgium), and had reached the rank of brigadier. Widgery was an active freemason.

== Barrister ==
After demobilisation Widgery changed to another branch of the legal profession as he was called to the bar by Lincoln's Inn in 1946. He gathered a reputation for being a fast talker, and eventually came to specialise in disputes over rating and town planning, where his methodical approach and self-control were useful attributes. In 1958 he was made a Queen's Counsel, the first such award given to a post-war barrister.

Widgery became a High Court judge in 1961, receiving the customary knighthood. As a judge he did not draw attention to himself and his judgments tended not to include any comments which were pithy, memorable or quotable. However, his calmness produced judgments which were generally regarded as fair and humane. One example cited in the Oxford Dictionary of National Biography was his justification for limiting damages for economic loss in Weller v Foot and Mouth Disease Research Institute, a judgment handed down in 1966. Widgery headed several inquiries during his term.

== Appellate courts ==
He received promotion to the Court of Appeal in 1968, but had barely got used to his new position when Lord Parker of Waddington (who had been Lord Chief Justice since 1958) announced his retirement. There was no obvious successor and Widgery was the most junior of the possible appointees. The Lord Chancellor, Lord Hailsham, chose Widgery largely on the basis of his administrative abilities. On 20 April 1971 he was created a life peer taking the title Baron Widgery, of South Molton in the County of Devon.

== Widgery Tribunal ==
Shortly after assuming office, Widgery was handed the politically sensitive job of conducting an inquiry into the events of 30 January 1972 in Derry, where soldiers from Parachute Regiment had shot and killed 13 civil rights marchers, an event commonly referred to as Bloody Sunday (a 14th person died shortly after Widgery's appointment). Widgery heard testimony from the soldiers, who claimed they had been shot at, while the marchers insisted that no one from the march was armed. Widgery produced a report, published in April 1972 that took the side of the soldiers. Widgery put the main blame for the deaths on the march organisers for creating a dangerous situation where a confrontation was inevitable. His strongest criticism of the soldiers was that their "firing bordered on the reckless".

The Widgery Tribunal report was accepted by the British government but met with a mixed reception in Northern Ireland; loyalists supported the report but Irish republicans, particularly those from the Bogside and Creggan areas, criticised Widgery's findings. The British government had acquired a level of goodwill in Northern Ireland due to its suspension of the Stormont Parliament, but that was said to have disappeared when Widgery's conclusions were published. Grievances with Widgery's findings in Northern Ireland lingered and the report remained contentious as the Northern Ireland peace process advanced in the 1990s.

In January 1998, on the eve of the 26th anniversary of Bloody Sunday, British prime minister Tony Blair announced a new inquiry, criticising the rushed process in which Widgery failed to take evidence from those wounded on Bloody Sunday and did not personally read eyewitness accounts. The resulting Bloody Sunday Inquiry lasted 12 years before the Saville Report was published on 15 June 2010. It overturned the findings of the Widgery Tribunal, concluding that soldiers present on Bloody Sunday had lied about their actions and had falsely claimed to have been attacked. The Daily Telegraph described the Saville Report as "[turning] the Widgery report on its head by exonerating the victims and delivering a damning account of the conduct of soldiers." The inquiry led British Prime Minister David Cameron to apologise, in the House of Commons in June 2010, for the "unjustified and unjustifiable" events of Bloody Sunday.

== Lord Chief Justice ==
Widgery ruled in the case R v Commissioner of Metropolitan Police, ex parte Blackburn on the duty of the Crown to prosecute. The case was described as follows: "A and B are alleged to have committed a crime. A is charged with the crime, convicted and sentenced. B is not charged. At the trial of A there is evidence which suggests that B may have committed or been a participant to the crime. Can the prosecution be compelled to prosecute B?" In 1968, a Divisional Court of Widgery, Melford Stevenson J and Brabin J issued judgment that "to prosecute must indisputably be a matter of discretion", which was affirmed by the Court of Appeal.

Widgery also ruled on the Crossman diaries case when the government attempted to suppress the publication on the grounds of confidentiality. He made it clear during the case that he felt Crossman had "broken the rules", but ultimately refused to grant an injunction preventing publication. In criminal cases, Widgery became concerned by an increasing number of cases resting on weak identification evidence. He declared in 1974 that misidentification was "the most serious chink in our armour when we say British justice is the best in the world." In March 1976, Widgery dismissed the first appeal by the Birmingham Six in respect of the Birmingham pub bombings.

== Personal life ==
In 1948, Widgery married Ann, daughter of William Edwin Kermode, of Peel, Isle of Man.

== Later years and death ==
His later years in office were marred by persistent ill health and mental decline. In Private Eye it was claimed that "he sits hunched and scowling, squinting into his books from a range of three inches, his wig awry. He keeps up a muttered commentary of bad-tempered and irrelevant questions – 'What d'you say?', 'Speak up', 'Don't shout', 'Whipper-snapper', etc.". He resisted attempts to get him to resign until the last moment, in 1980. For at least 18 months previously he had not been in control of either his administrative work or his legal pronouncements, he would fall asleep in court, and it soon became apparent that he was suffering from dementia. He died two days after his 70th birthday, in 1981.

In Jimmy McGovern's 2002 film Sunday, which portrayed the events of Bloody Sunday and subsequent inquiry, Widgery was portrayed by Michael Byrne.

== Arms ==
Coat of arms of John Widgery, Baron Widgery
Crest Rising from a rocky mount a widgeon Proper in the beak a pair of scales Or. Escutcheon Vert on water in base barry wavy Proper a lymphad Argent and a chief Gules charged with a canon between two millrinds Or. Supporters Dexter an owl guardant and sinister a widgeon Proper. Motto God My Guide

Legal offices
Preceded by The Lord Parker of Waddington	Lord Chief Justice; 1971 – 1980	Succeeded by The Lord Lane
