= John R. Buckmaster =

English actor (1915–1983)

- Buckmaster in c. 1935
- Born: John Rodney Buckmaster; 15 July 1915; Frinton-on-Sea, Essex, England
- Died: 1 April 1983 (aged 67); Roehampton, Greater London, England
- Education: Eton College
- Occupations: Actor, singer-songwriter
- Years active: 1934–1955
- Mother: Gladys Cooper (1888–1971)
- Relatives: John Merivale (stepbrother); Robert Morley (brother-in-law); Robert Hardy (brother-in-law); Sheridan Morley (nephew)

John Rodney Buckmaster (18 July 1915 – 1 April 1983) was an English actor (Note: Not to be confused with John Caravoglia Buckmaster (25 October 1914 – 9 March 1995), another English actor contemporary with John R. Buckmaster. John C. Buckmaster—son of actor-manager Charles Buckmaster, of Italian ancestry—started out as a young actor in the 1930s. During World War II, he enlisted in the London Scottish regiment, where he served with Bruce Copp, also an English actor. John C. Buckmaster saw action in North Africa, then north into Sicily and finally in and around Naples, during late 1943 and early 1944. There he met a young concert pianist, Ermenegilda ("Gilda") Maltese (1918–1989)—a graduate of the Naples Conservatory of Music (Sweeting 2017)—during a production of Madama Butterfly, at the newly restored San Carlo Opera House. They married on 15 August 1945 and, after the war, made their home in Earl's Court, London (Copp 2015, pp. 67–69). They had three children: Paul, Rosemary, and Adrian. John C. Buckmaster continued to have small acting jobs until 1989. In 1994, he moved to Sydney where he died on 9 March 1995.) on the stage, in films and on television, and a cabaret singer-songwriter. He was the son of actress Dame Gladys Cooper (1888–1971) and Captain Herbert Buckmaster (1881–1966). Educated at Elstree and Eton, he followed his mother into the acting profession and worked on both sides of the Atlantic.

During World War II, he served for a time as a private in the United States Army Air Forces before resuming his acting career until the mid-1950s. He suffered increasingly from mental illness, which led to his confinement at the Priory Hospital, where he died by suicide on 1 April 1983.

== Early life ==
John Buckmaster was born on 18 July 1915 in Frinton-on-Sea where his mother, actress Gladys Cooper, had bought a cottage. Most people had fled from Frinton at the start of World War I, but Cooper kept her daughter, Joan (b. 1910), and baby John there in the care of a nanny, Sarah Aves, while she herself stayed in London to be near the theatre and going down to be with them at weekends.

His father was Herbert John Buckmaster, a veteran of the Boer War, known as "Buck", who founded Buck's Club and would later put the 'Buck' into Buck's Fizz. Herbert Buckmaster enlisted as soon as the war started and was given a commission in the 12th Reserve Regiment of Cavalry. After an initial posting in Aldershot, he went to France with the Royal Horse Guards in early 1915, where he remained for three-and-a-half years. During the war, Cooper wrote daily to her husband, giving him regular updates on their two children, including their son's stages of development from infant to toddler and little boy.

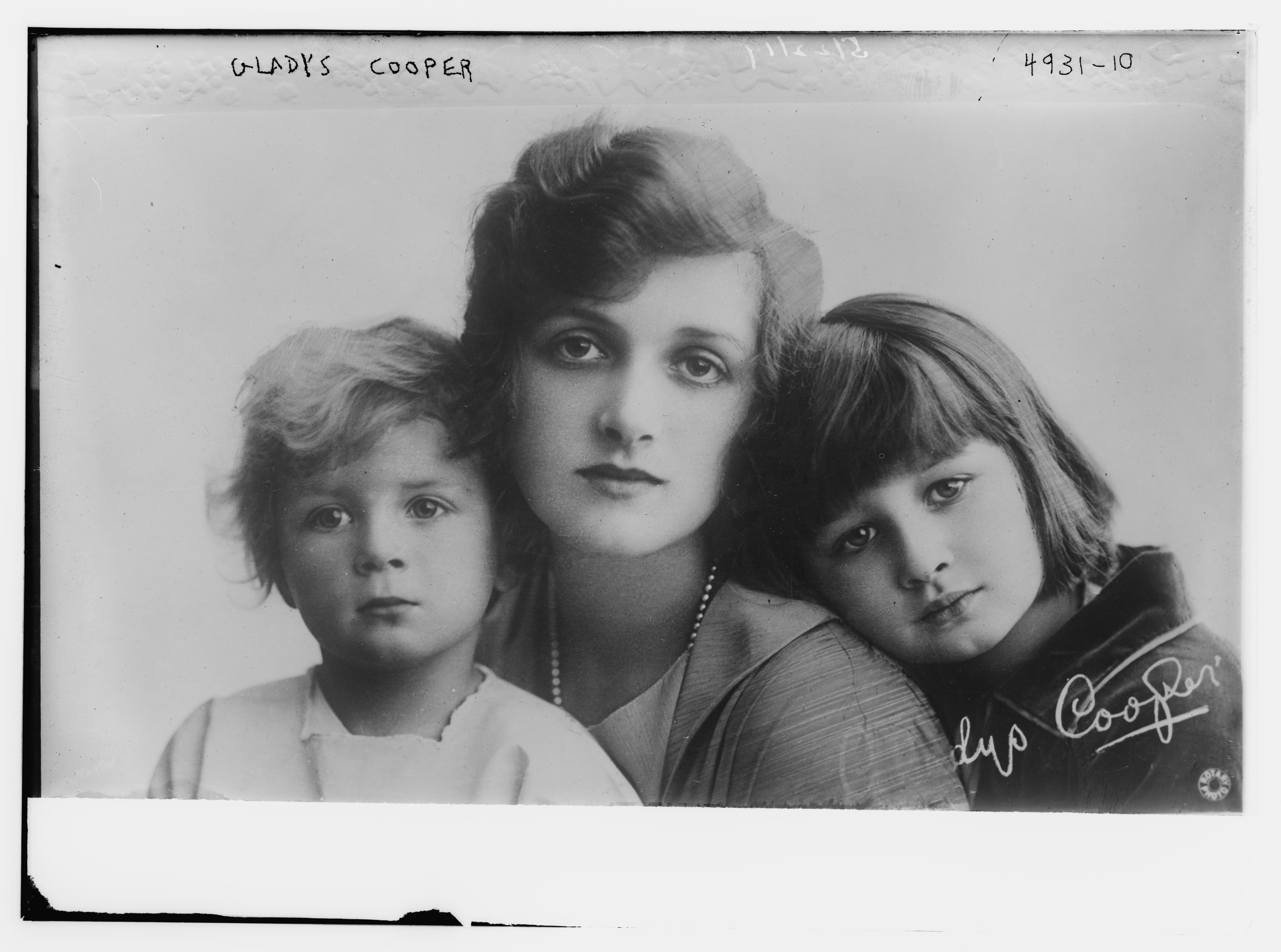
Gladys Cooper, with children John (left) and Joan Buckmaster

Cooper continued to be widely photographed on picture-postcards in which her children also featured. At the end of the war, the couple found that they had drifted apart; they divorced amicably on 12 December 1921 and remained close friends for the rest of their lives.

John Buckmaster attended Elstree preparatory school where, according to his father, he was very happy; he played tennis and was in both cricket and football elevens. Throughout his childhood, he was regularly reported in the Press as an interesting and decorative news item. At the age of seven, a picture shows him dressed as a naval cadet and carrying a telescope under one arm. At nine he stands, racket in hand, beside his mother at the Frinton Juvenile Lawn Tennis Tournament, in which he was the youngest boy competitor. A year later, with boxing gloves on, he is facing the ex-welterweight champion of Europe, Johnny Summers, who had taught him for two years, and with whom he sparred at the Brighton Hospital Tournament in July 1925.

On 14 June 1927, Cooper married Sir Neville Pearson, and gave birth to their daughter, Sally, c. 1929. (Note: Sally Pearson's date of birth is undocumented by the sources. In his biography of Gladys Cooper, Sheridan Morley (Morley 1979, pp. 129–134) wrote that she gave birth during a career break she took between the end of her two hundred performances in Somerset Maugham's play The Sacred Flame—which ran at the Playhouse Theatre from 8 February 1929 for eight months (Rogal 1997, pp. 241–242)—and her return to the stage in H. M. Harwood's play Cynara—which ran at the Playhouse Theatre from June 1930 (Nicoll 2009, p. 130).) Buckmaster, now at Eton College, found the second marriage difficult to accept and became a difficult teenager. Although handsome, witty and talented, he was sensitive and highly strung. Of Cooper's three children, he was emotionally closest to his mother and proved deeply affected by her remarriage, as he and Pearson disliked each other intensely.

In early 1934, when his mother left England to expand her stage career into North America, Buckmaster moved to a flat in Chelsea with his nanny, Sarah Aves, to keep home for him. While in the USA, Cooper met and eventually married Philip Merivale on 30 April 1937, after obtaining a divorce from Pearson on 16 October 1936. They lived mainly in California and worked extensively in both Hollywood and Broadway, also supporting the Red Cross British Relief Fund and running a small theatre for servicemen during World War II.

John Buckmaster was very fond of his stepfather Merivale, upon whose death, on 12 March 1946, he wrote a tribute poem and left it on his mother's desk one morning.

== Career ==
One of Buckmaster's earliest appearances on stage was in J. M. Barrie's The Admirable Crichton at the age of eight. After its dress rehearsal, Sybil Thorndike had declared he was "the best actor I have seen."

At twenty, Buckmaster had already been performing professionally for a year when, in 1935, he played Georges Dupont in Robert E. Sherwood's English adaptation of Jacques Deval's 1933 play Tovarich at the Lyric Theatre, where it ran for 414 performances and where the wardrobe mistress was Mrs Mott ("Motty") – his mother's dresser for over twenty years. The same year, he played Mike Doyle in George Pearson's film Checkmate, based on the novel by Amy Kennedy Gould.

During the first half of 1936, Buckmaster moved to New York to join his mother and Philip Merivale in Call It a Day, a Dodie Smith family comedy in which he played the son of his mother's character. As a handsome and talented young actor, he had inherited her gift for mimicry that later put him in the top flight of cabaret artists on Broadway, and seemed poised to follow her success on the stage. At the end of 1938, Buckmaster was playing the part of Lord Alfred Douglas in Norman Marshall's production of Oscar Wilde. In the title role of this play, Robert Morley—who became Buckmaster's brother-in-law after marrying his sister Joan on 23 February 1940—had made something of a sensation, repeating on Broadway the performance he had given at the little Gate Theatre in London a year earlier. During this period, Buckmaster and Morley shared a flat in New York and got on very well.

John and I rented a pianola for our apartment, and gave all-night poker parties. I even befriended the local police commissioner, Kennedy, who took me on night raids in his police car and kindly introduced me to several leading members of the Mafia. Nowhere in the world is success in the theatre so enjoyable as in that city, where all the head waiters know your weekly box-office takings, and all the cab drivers are out front on your opening night.

— Robert Morley, Robert My Father (2017)

In early September 1939, Cooper wrote to her daughter Joan in England that "John and Jack [Merivale] are thinking of joining up in Canada. John has been writing awfully good songs lately, and making quite a name for himself in cabaret" although, by Christmas 1939, she added that she was "managing to send Johnnie some money now and again." In July 1940, not having seen her son for 18 months, Cooper drove east to Central City, Colorado where he was performing in cabaret. During his act, she was introduced as "John Buckmaster's mother", which he said made a nice change from him always being known as "Gladys Cooper's son".

By the Spring of 1943, Buckmaster had enlisted as a private in the United States Army Air Forces, and composed a song he contributed to one of the Service magazines shortly after he joined. His stepbrother Jack Merivale was flying for the Royal Canadian Air Force, and both of them spent time at the family home in California when they were on leave.

In 1946, Cooper decided to launch the stage career of her youngest daughter Sally Pearson (a.k.a. Sally Cooper), who played Lady Agatha Carlisle in a successful Broadway production of Oscar Wilde's Lady Windermere's Fan, which included her half-brother (Buckmaster) as Lord Darlington and her stepbrother (Merivale) as Sir James Royston.

During the late 1940s and up to the mid-1950s, Buckmaster remained in the US, performing in plays such as: An Inspector Calls (1947–1948), Caesar and Cleopatra (1949–1950), Getting Married (1951), and Saint Joan (1951–1952). These stage performances were interspersed with TV appearances in a handful of plays and films, a test for the role of Caligula in The Robe in February 1953, and character roles in two episodes of the 1954 Sherlock Holmes TV series, with Ronald Howard in the lead role. At this point, Buckmaster's acting career ended with the worsening of his mental illness.

== Personal life ==
Jean Gillie

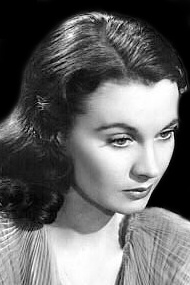
Vivien Leigh

From the beginning of his stage career, Buckmaster featured regularly in gossip columns as the escort of up-and-coming young actresses such as Vivien Leigh and Jean Gillie. Leigh later told Jack Merivale that, in August 1935 while married to Herbert Leigh Holman, her first affair had been with Buckmaster.

At Vivien Leigh's insistence, Buckmaster—who seemed to know everyone in the theatre—introduced her to Laurence Olivier in the autumn of 1935 at the Savoy Grill, where he and his first wife Jill Esmond dined regularly after his performance in Romeo and Juliet. Buckmaster and Leigh had another brief affair in 1953.

In Gladys Cooper's family tree, Buckmaster's entry shows that he never married, nor had any children.

== Mental illness and death ==
In the summer of 1945, when they were both on leave at the family home in California, Jack Merivale noticed uneasiness in Buckmaster's relationship with his mother: "Whenever I'm with her, I feel I'm always doing the wrong thing, whatever it is."

At the end of the Lady Windermere's Fan run in the spring of 1947, Buckmaster suffered the first of the regular mental breakdowns which became increasingly violent over the following decade, even though shock treatment was at first successful in containing his acute schizophrenia. In his 1979 biography of Gladys Cooper, her grandson Sheridan Morley summarised the presumed causes of Buckmaster's condition:

[T]he strains of a war in which he'd felt himself perhaps involved too distantly and too late, of a number of increasingly unhappy love affairs, and of maintaining a career which had begun with rather too much glitter and not enough training, were proving too much for John, and under those pressures and the other pressure of being Gladys's son he was now, slowly but surely, to crack – temporarily at first, then for longer periods until in the late 1950s a series of increasingly effective drugs were able to bring him to his present and very controlled state. The process was however a long, often violent and painful one and starting as it did so soon after her last husband's death it was inevitably to cloud equally darkly Gladys's final years.

— Sheridan Morley, Gladys Cooper (1979)

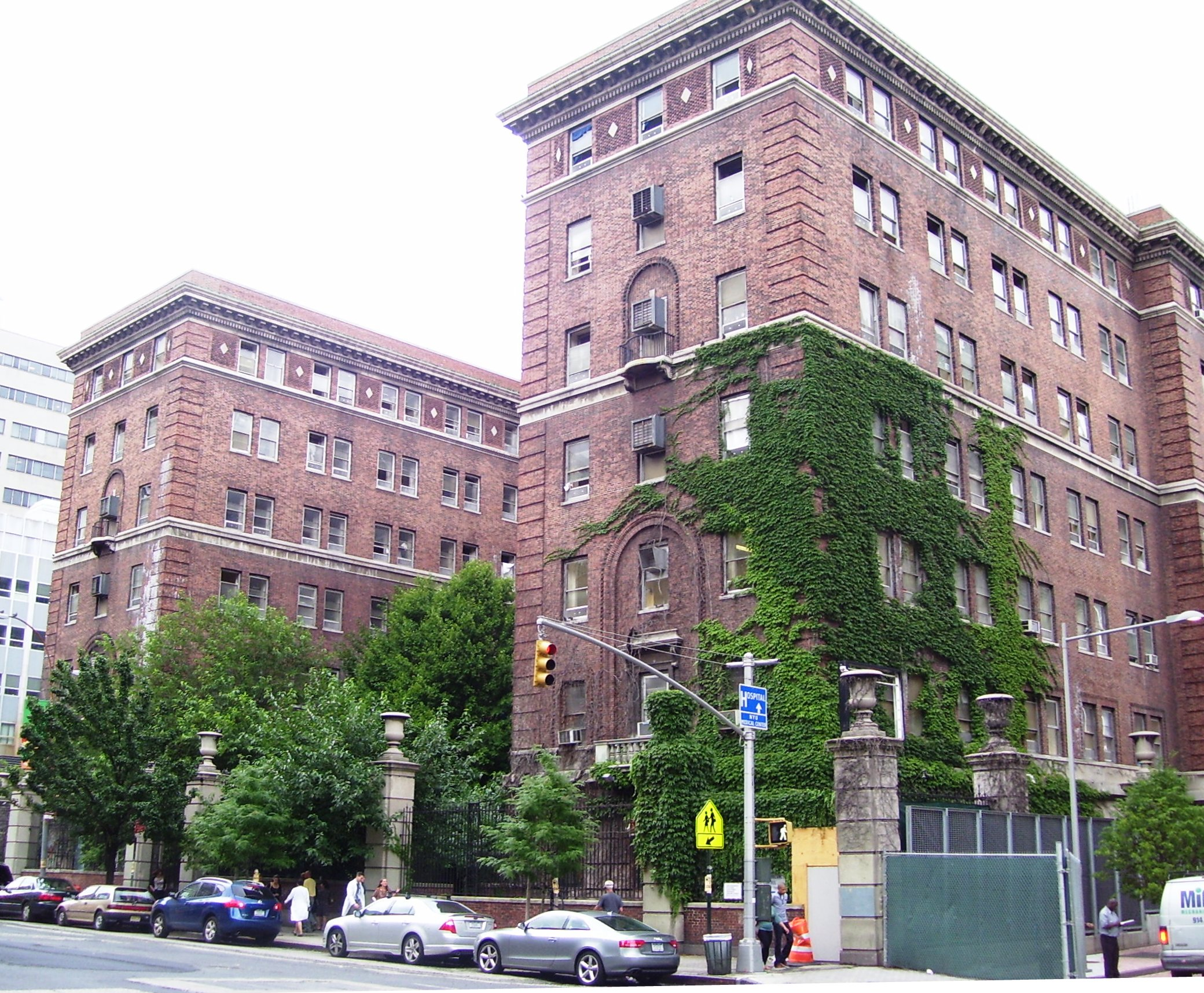
Bellevue Hospital

In February 1952, Buckmaster, having just finished a highly successful and critically acclaimed Broadway run as the Dauphin in St Joan, had the worst and most violent of his mental breakdowns. Accused of molesting women on the corner of Madison Avenue and 67th Street at 7 am, he was chased through the streets of Manhattan, arrested, and charged with felonious assault and the illegal possession of two knives which he was alleged to have brandished at the police. He was committed to the Bellevue Hospital for a psychiatric check, and then transferred to the State Hospital for the mentally ill at Kings Park, Long Island, from where his release was eventually secured by Jack Merivale and Noël Coward.

In mid-March 1953, Buckmaster visited Vivien Leigh, who was filming Elephant Walk in Hollywood and had rented a mansion on Hanover Drive, while Olivier was in Ischia on a break from organising theatrical and film events for the Queen's coronation that summer. Leigh was going through one of her psychotic breakdowns at the time and the studio doctor and psychiatrist had organised round the clock care for her, in which David Niven became involved. After Buckmaster had unsuccessfully attempted to persuade Leigh that they could fly out of an upper window together, Niven called Stewart Granger and asked him to intervene by forcibly removing Buckmaster from the house and driving him back to his hotel.

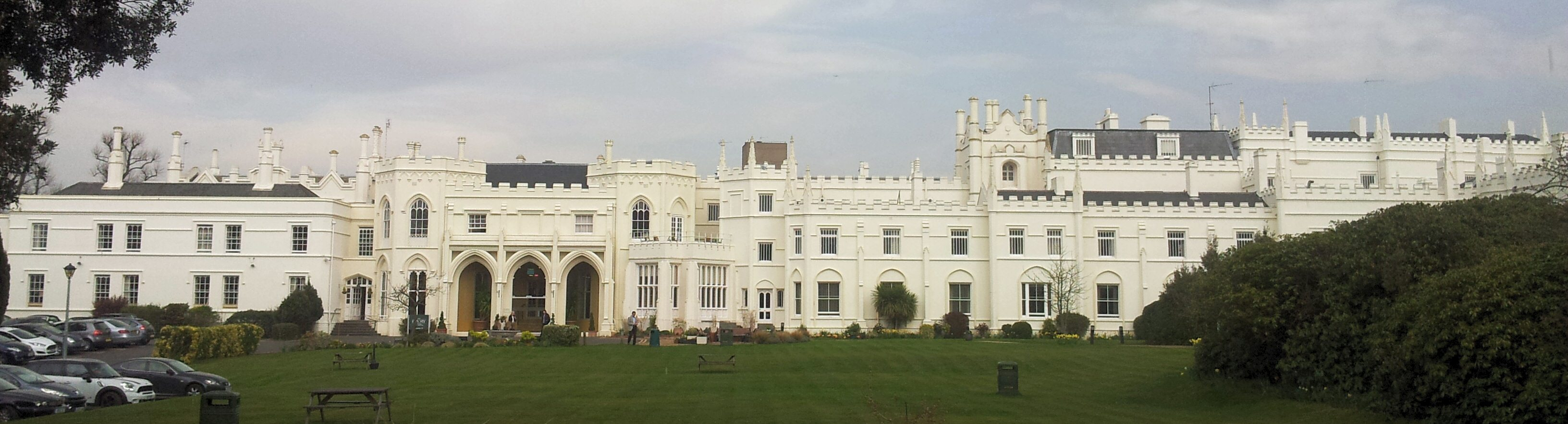
The Priory Hospital

By 1960, Buckmaster was settled into the Priory Hospital where he would spend the rest of his life. He steadfastly declined visits from either of his parents, blaming them for his breakdowns. He died from suicide there on 1 April 1983.

== Selected performances ==
=== Theatre ===
- Tovarich, as Georges Dupont (Lyric Theatre, London. October 1935)
- Call It a Day, as Martin Hilton (Morosco Theatre, New York. January 1936 – July 1936)
- Oscar Wilde, as Lord Alfred Douglas (Fulton Theatre, New York. October 1938 – May 1939)
- Lady Windermere's Fan, as Lord Darlington (Cort Theatre, New York. October 1946 – April 1947)
- An Inspector Calls, as Gerald Croft (Booth Theatre, New York. October 1947 – January 1948)
- Caesar and Cleopatra, as Apollodorus (National Theatre, New York. December 1949 – April 1950)
- Getting Married, as St. John Hotchkiss (ANTA Playhouse, New York. 13–20 May 1951)
- Saint Joan, as The Dauphin (Cort Theatre, New York. October 1951 – January 1952)
- Saint Joan, as The Dauphin (New Century Theatre, New York. January 1952 – February 1952)

=== Filmography ===
- Checkmate (1935) as Mike Doyle
- Uncle Dynamite (29 January 1950, The Philco Television Playhouse TV Movie)
- Dirty Eddie (9 April 1950, The Philco Television Playhouse TV Movie)
- The Sun (13 May 1950, The Chevrolet Tele-Theatre TV Movie)
- Blockade (23 March 1951, Pulitzer Prize Playhouse TV Movie)
- "The Case of the Haunted Gainsborough" (4 July 1955, Sherlock Holmes TV Series; Episode 35) as Bartender
- "The Case of the Unlucky Gambler" (18 July 1955, Sherlock Holmes TV Series; Episode 37) as Mac Leis
