= Gordon Richards (actor) =

English actor (1893–1964)

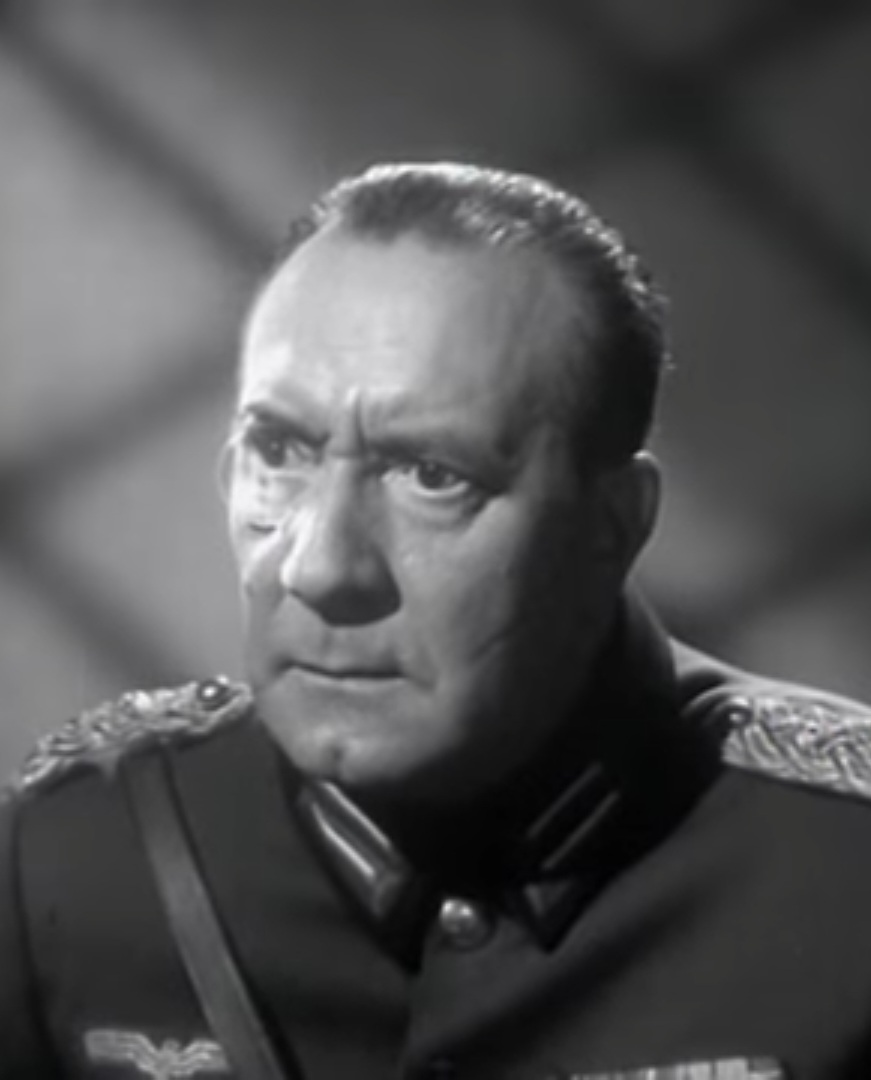
- Richards in Women in the Night (1948)
- Born: 27 October 1893; Gillingham, Kent, England
- Died: 13 January 1964 (aged 70); Los Angeles, California, U.S.
- Education: Royal Academy of Dramatic Art
- Occupation: Actor
- Years active: 1909–1956

Gordon Richards (27 October 1893 – 13 January 1964) was an English actor who had an active international career on the stage and in television and film for more than 50 years.

He began his career performing in theatres in London's West End in 1909, and made his Broadway debut in 1913. He appeared in numerous plays and musicals on Broadway through 1951. Active as a performer in both television and film, he appeared in 35 Hollywood films during his career.

== Life and career ==
Born in Gillingham, Kent, England, Richards was trained at the Royal Academy of Dramatic Art in London where his fellow classmate was Roland Young. He began acting professionally on the London stage at the age of 16 in 1909. He became a member of Sir Johnston Forbes-Robertson's theater company; a group with which he toured to the United States in 1913–1914. He made his Broadway debut with that company on October 20, 1913 at the Shubert Theatre as the Nubian Sentinel in George Bernard Shaw's Caesar and Cleopatra. With that group he also portrayed the First Messenger in William Shakespeare's Othello at the Schubert Theatre in 1914.

Richards served in the British Army during World War I. He made several more appearance on Broadway upon his return to the United States in 1927, including Frederick Witney's The Adventurous Age (1927), Cosmo Hamilton's Caste (1927), Robert Nichols's Wings Over Europe (1928), Kenyon Scott's A Noble Rogue (1929), Martha Stanley's Let and Sub-Let (1930), Michael Grismaijer's The Noble Experiment (1930), Howard Warren Comstock's Doctor X (1931), John Larkin's Society Girl (1931–1932), Thetta Quay Franks's Money In The Air (1932), A. J. Minor's Masks and Faces (1933), Hardwick Nevin's Whatever Possessed Her (1934), Arthur Schwartz's Virginia (1937), Ernest Pascal's I Am Youth (1938), Leslie and Sewell Stokes's Oscar Wilde (1938–1939), Cole Porter's Something for the Boys (1943–1944), Gottfried Reinhardt's Helen Goes To Troy (1944), and Philip Barry's Second Threshold (1951). He also starred in National tours of The Great Waltz and Springtime for Henry.

From 1942–1956 Richards appeared in 35 Hollywood films in mainly small to mid sized character roles. Some of his more substantial appearances included the painter Joshua Reynolds in Kitty (1945), Sir Harry Bragdon in White Pongo (1945), Tom Walker in Flight to Nowhere (1946), Burton Stallings in Larceny in Her Heart (1946), Sam Thompson in Linda, Be Good (1947), Police Inspector McIver in 13 Lead Soldiers (1948), Col. Von Meyer in Women in the Night (1948), and Clayton in Song of Surrender (1949). On American television he portrayed Hubert Twombly in The Adventures of Rin Tin Tin in the 1950s.

He died in Los Angeles at the age of 70 in 1964.

== Selected filmography ==
- The Wife Takes a Flyer (1942) - Maj. Wilson (uncredited)
- Slightly Dangerous (1943) - Garrett - Butler (uncredited)
- The Story of Dr. Wassell (1944) - Naval Officer (uncredited)
- The Canterville Ghost (1944) - Nobleman (uncredited)
- Frenchman's Creek (1944) - Guest (uncredited)
- Mrs. Parkington (1944) - James (uncredited)
- National Velvet (1944) - Doctor (uncredited)
- The Affairs of Susan (1945) - Mr. Giddon (uncredited)
- Molly and Me (1945) - Jamie McDougall (uncredited)
- Week-End at the Waldorf (1945) - Headwaiter (uncredited)
- White Pongo (1945) - Sir Harry Bragdon
- Kitty (1945) - Sir Joshua Reynolds
- Confidential Agent (1945) - Immigration Officer (uncredited)
- Naughty Nanette (1946, Short) - Papa Belleau
- Larceny in Her Heart (1946) - Burton Stallings
- Night and Day (1946) - Cochran (uncredited)
- Flight to Nowhere (1946) - Tom Walker
- Undercurrent (1946) - Headwaiter (uncredited)
- The Imperfect Lady (1946) - Gladstone
- Ladies' Man (1947) - Mr. Bolton, Sponsor (uncredited)
- The Hucksters (1947) - Conrad (uncredited)
- Golden Earrings (1947) - Club Member with Denistoun (uncredited)
- Unconquered (1947) - Sheriff (uncredited)
- Merton of the Movies (1947) - Kristen - Beulah's Butler (uncredited)
- Linda, Be Good (1947) - Sam Thompson
- Cass Timberlane (1947) - Butler (uncredited)
- Women in the Night (1948) - Colonel Von Meyer
- The Big Clock (1948) - Warren Parks (uncredited)
- 13 Lead Soldiers (1948) - Police Insp. McIver
- A Connecticut Yankee in King Arthur's Court (1948) - Tour Guide (uncredited)
- The Secret of St. Ives (1949) - Prosecution Officer (uncredited)
- Song of Surrender (1949) - Clayton - Butler (uncredited)
- Challenge to Lassie (1949) - Constable (uncredited)
- Port of New York (1949) - Florentine's Purser (uncredited)
- Samson and Delilah (1949) - Guide (uncredited)
- The Big Hangover (1950) - Williams, the Chauffeur
- Kiss Tomorrow Goodbye (1950) - Butler (uncredited)
- The Man Who Cheated Himself (1950) - Albert: the Butler
- Washington Story (1952) - Butler (uncredited)
- The Prisoner of Zenda (1952) - Dignitary (uncredited)
- Million Dollar Mermaid (1952) - Casey (uncredited)
- Titanic (1953) - Mr. Webster - Manager of Clothing Shop (uncredited)
- Dream Wife (1953) - Sir Cecil (uncredited)
- Latin Lovers (1953) - George - Paul's Butler (uncredited)
- Rhapsody (1954) - English Butler (uncredited)
- Rose Marie (1954) - Attorney (uncredited)
- The Rainbow Jacket (1954) - Jockey (uncredited)
- The Student Prince (1954) - Major Domo (uncredited)
- The Prodigal (1955) - Nahreeb's Scribe (uncredited)
- Cavalcade of America (1955, Episode: "The Rescue of Dr. Beanes") - (uncredited)
- Moonfleet (1955) - Marling (uncredited)
- The Scarlet Coat (1955) - Mr. Cameron (uncredited)
- The King's Thief (1955) - Courier (uncredited)
- The Tender Trap (1955) - Doorman (uncredited)
- Gaby (1956) - Air Raid Warden (uncredited)
- High Society (1956) - Dexter-Haven's Butler
- Lust for Life (1956) - Customer (uncredited)
- The Best Things in Life Are Free (1956) - Butler (uncredited)
- The Opposite Sex (1956) - Hilliards' Butler (uncredited)
- Wanted Dead or Alive (TV series) – (1959) season 2 episode 3 (The Matchmaker) : Zeb Williams
