= Sheridan Morley =

English author and broadcaster (1941–2007)

- Born: Sheridan Morley; 5 December 1941; Ascot, Berkshire, England
- Died: 16 February 2007 (aged 65); London, England
- Occupations: Broadcaster; author; biographer; critic; stage director
- Spouses: Margaret Gudejko (m. 1965; div. 1990) Ruth Leon (m. 1995)

Sheridan Morley (5 December 1941 − 16 February 2007) was an English author, biographer, critic and broadcaster. He was the official biographer of Sir John Gielgud and wrote biographies of many other theatrical figures he had known, including Noël Coward. Nicholas Kenyon called him a "cultural omnivore" who was "genuinely popular with people".

== Early life ==
Sheridan Morley was born in Ascot, Berkshire, in a nursing home opposite Ascot Racecourse, the eldest son of actor Robert Morley and grandson, via his mother Joan Buckmaster, of the actress Dame Gladys Cooper. He was named after Sheridan Whiteside, the title role his father was playing in a long-running production of The Man Who Came to Dinner at the Savoy Theatre in London.

He had close family connections with stars of the stage: in addition to his father and his maternal grandmother, his uncle was the actor John Buckmaster, his aunt Sally Pearson married the actor Robert Hardy, and Joanna Lumley was a cousin [N.B. There is no genealogical evidence to prove this claim is correct]. His godparents were the dramatist Sewell Stokes and the actor Peter Bull; Morley's son Hugo was one of Noël Coward's many godchildren.

Morley grew up in Wargrave in Berkshire, and in Hollywood and New York, where his father was working. His father placed an advertisement in The Times, seeking a suitable school for his son: "Father with horrible memories of own schooldays at Wellington is searching for a school for his son, where the food matters as much as the education and the standards are those of a good three-star seaside hotel."

The successful reply came from Sizewell Hall in Suffolk, a coeducational preparatory school. This was owned and run in laissez-faire style by a Dutch Quaker, Harry Tuyn, although the story told in Morley's obituaries that subjects such as maths and Latin were not taught at Sizewell Hall on the grounds that they were too boring is untrue. Morley was well taught there in the full range of subjects. After the school closed in 1955, he followed the Tuyns to Château-d'Œx, Switzerland, as a private pupil. Having attended a crammer in Kensington High Street, Morley went on to read modern languages at Merton College, Oxford, from 1960, and became involved in student drama alongside Michael York, David Wood, Sam Walters, and Oliver Ford Davies. He graduated with third-class honours, and then spent a year teaching drama at the University of Hawaii.

== Career ==
Sheridan Morley worked as a late-night newscaster for ITN from 1965, before moving to the BBC to present Late Night Line-Up for BBC 2 from 1967 to 1971, alongside Joan Bakewell and Tony Bilbow. He also presented Film Night for BBC 2 in 1971 and 1972. He presented Kaleidoscope for BBC Radio 4, and an innovatory arts programme for BBC Radio 2 from 1990 to 2004.

He had begun The Radio Two Arts Programme in April 1990. At first it consisted of three two-hour programmes a week: on Friday nights a regional show, on Sunday nights an arts documentary covering a single subject, and on Saturday nights the show which was to become the flagship of the series, a magazine programme tackling eight different subjects in every show, interspersed with at least eight related musical recordings. He then moved to a new programme format of Melodies For You in 2004, again on BBC Radio 2. He broadcast his last Melodies programme in November 2006, three months before his death in February 2007.

He also made frequent appearances as the guest in the Dictionary Corner for the Channel 4 game show Countdown.

Morley's best-known work was his biography of Noël Coward, A Talent to Amuse, first published in 1969. Coward gave his full blessing, providing Morley with a list of his friends, and another of his enemies, telling him to start with the second first – which would make for a better book.

Morley joined The Times as deputy features editor in 1973, and then joined Punch in 1975 as its drama critic and arts editor, remaining with the magazine until 1989. In the late 1980s, he became a regular arts diarist for The Times and was its TV critic from 1989 to 1990. He then worked as drama critic for The Spectator from 1990; he was replaced in 2001 by Toby Young. Then, after a short period at the New Statesman, where he gave way to Michael Portillo, he joined the Daily Express in 2004, where he remained until 2007. Meanwhile, he was also a drama critic for the International Herald Tribune from 1979 to 2005, and film critic for the Sunday Express from 1992 to 1995. In 1990, he was Arts Journalist of the Year, and was also nominated for a Grammy.

His play Noël and Gertie, about Noël Coward and Gertrude Lawrence, opened in London in 1986, starring Simon Cadell and Joanna Lumley, and ran for nine years. It was performed in the US with Harry Groener and Twiggy in the lead roles. He also wrote a show based on the songs of Vivian Ellis, Spread a Little Happiness, which played in 1992.

Morley's last work as a theatre director was in 1999 with a revival of Noël Coward's A Song at Twilight, first at The King's Head Theatre in Islington, and then at the Gielgud Theatre in a West End run from October 1999 to March 2000, starring Corin Redgrave, Kika Markham, Mathew Bose, and Vanessa Redgrave.

== Legacy ==
Morley's life was posthumously celebrated on 22 May 2007 with a gala afternoon performance at the Gielgud Theatre, organised by his widow Ruth Leon, with contributions and performances by friends and colleagues, including Liz Robertson, Edward Fox, Jenny Seagrove, Cameron Mackintosh, Patricia Hodge, Michael Law and Annabel Leventon.

Morley's archive is held by Kingston University, London. The Sheridan Morley Prize for Theatre Biography, last won by Stephen Sondheim in 2012, was founded in his memory but ceased to function in 2014.

== Personal life ==
Morley's first marriage was to Margaret Gudejko, whom he met in Hawaii, in 1965; the couple had three children together and divorced in 1990. Ruth Leon, the critic and television producer, became his second wife in 1995. Morley and Leon had known each other since 1960. She had gone to Oxford to meet a friend who was attending the university, and was introduced to Morley. The two maintained a platonic friendship from then on before, decades later, deciding to divorce their spouses and get married. In 2011, Leon published a memoir of her husband, But What Comes After..., in which she stated that Morley suffered a stroke in November 2002, the effects of which exacerbated a bipolar disorder.

== Bibliography ==
=== Biographies ===
- A Talent to Amuse: A Biography of Noël Coward, London: Heinemann, 1969. ISBN 0-434-47895-4. Revised edition 1974; re-issued with a new Prologue, 1985. Later subtitled "The First Biography of Noël Coward".
- Oscar Wilde (1976)
- Marlene Dietrich (1977)
- Sybil Thorndike: A Life in the Theatre (1977)
- Gladys Cooper: Biography (1979)
- Gertrude Lawrence: A Bright Particular Star, London: Weidenfeld & Nicolson, 1981. ISBN 0-297-77882-X
- Katharine Hepburn, (1984)
- Ingrid Bergman (1985)
- Other Side of the Moon: The Life of David Niven (1985)
- Elizabeth Taylor (1988)
- Odd Man Out: The Life of James Mason (1989)
- Robert: My Father, London: Weidenfeld & Nicolson (1993).
- Audrey Hepburn (1993)
- Shall We Dance: The Life of Ginger Rogers (1995)
- Gene Kelly (1996)
- Dirk Bogarde: Rank Outsider (1996)
- Marilyn Monroe (1998)
- Hey, Mr Producer (Cameron Mackintosh) (1998, with Ruth Leon)
- Judy Garland: Beyond The Rainbow (1999, with Ruth Leon)
- John Gielgud: The Authorized Biography, London: Hodder & Stoughton, 2001. ISBN 0-340-36803-9

=== Theatre retrospectives and collected reviews ===
- Theatre 71: Plays, Players, Playwrights, Opera, Ballet, edited by Sheridan Morley (Hutchinson, 1971). ISBN 0-09-109210-8
- Theatre 72, edited (Hutchinson, 1972). ISBN 0-09-113780-2
- Theatre 73, edited (Hutchinson, 1973). ISBN 0-09-117920-3
- Theatre 74, edited (Hutchinson, 1974). ISBN 0-09-122290-7
- Review Copies: Plays & Players in London 1970-74 (Robson Books, 1974). ISBN 0-903895-25-0
- The Theatre Addict's Archive (Elm Tree Books, 1977). ISBN 0-241-89806-4
- Shooting Stars: Plays and Players,1975-1983 (Quartet Books, 1983). ISBN 0-7043-2388-5
- Spread A Little Happiness: The First Hundred Years of the British Musical (Thames & Hudson, 1987). ISBN 0-500-01398-5
- Our Theatres in the Eighties (John Curtis/Hodder & Stoughton, 1990). ISBN 0-340-50979-1
- A Century of Theatre, with Ruth Leon (Oberon Books, 2000). ISBN 1-84002-058-X
- Spectator at the Theatre: A decade of First Nights 1990-1999 (Oberon Books, 2002). ISBN 1-84002-247-7

=== Other works ===
- The Stephen Sondheim Songbook (Chappel/Elm Tree Books, 1979). ISBN 0-241-10176-X
- The Brits in Hollywood: Tales from the Hollywood Raj (UK: Weidenfeld & Nicolson, 1983). ISBN 0-297-78289-4, also published as Tales From The Hollywood Raj: The British, the Movies, and Tinseltown (New York: Viking, 1983). ISBN 0-670-69162-3
- The Noël Coward Diaries (with Graham Payn; Weidenfeld & Nicolson, 1982). ISBN 0-297-78142-1
- The Great Stage Stars (Angus & Robertson, Australia and UK, 1986) ISBN 0-207-14970-4. Dedicated: "For Margaret whose book this really is.'"
- Theatrical Companion to Coward (second edition, with Barry Day, Oberon Books, 2000). ISBN 1-84002-054-7
- Asking For Trouble, memoirs. (Hodder & Stoughton, 2002). ISBN 0-340-82057-8
- An Evening with Sheridan Morley and Michael Law with Judy Campbell (CD).
