= Sewell Stokes =

English author, playwright (1902–1979)

- Born: Francis Martin Sewell Stokes; United Kingdom
- Died: United Kingdom
- Occupations: Playwright, actor, radio producer
- Notable work: Oscar Wilde
- Relatives: Leslie Stokes

Francis Martin Sewell Stokes (16 November 1902, London – 2 November 1979, London) was an English novelist, biographer, playwright, screenwriter, broadcaster and prison visitor. He collaborated on a number of occasions with his brother, Leslie Stokes, an actor and later in life a BBC radio producer, with whom he shared a flat for many years overlooking the British Museum.

== Biography ==
Born in Hampstead, London, Stokes was educated at Cranleigh School in Surrey and his first job in 1918 was as a book reviewer and gossip writer with The Sunday Times in London. Three years later, he became assistant editor for T.P.'s Weekly, a radical newspaper founded in 1902 by the Irish journalist and member of parliament Thomas Power O'Connor.

In 1928 Stokes published Pilloried! a series of eighteen interviews of prominent people illustrated by Gabriel Atkin and issued by The Richards Press in the UK. The critical and humorous portraits are of Lady Astor, W. Somerset Maugham, Dorothy Gish, Sinclair Lewis, Ronald Firbank, Jackie Coogan, G.B. Stern, Victoria Cross, Frank Harris, Harold Harmsworth, 1st Viscount Rothermere, Philip Gibbs, Rex Ingram, The Sitwells among others.

The author became friendly with the American dancer Isadora Duncan towards the very end of her life, and in 1928, shortly after her death, wrote a memoir of his conversations with her entitled Isadora, an Intimate Portrait. Years later, he co-wrote the film script for the BBC TV film Isadora Duncan, the Biggest Dancer in the World, with director Ken Russell. Starring Vivian Pickles and Peter Bowles, the film was first broadcast on 22 September 1966. In 1968 his memoir of Duncan, together with her autobiography, My Life, were adapted by Melvyn Bragg for the film Isadora (US title: The Loves of Isadora), directed by Karel Reisz and starring Vanessa Redgrave and James Fox. In his 1954 novel Recital in Paris the character of Sarah Menken was substantially modelled on that of Isadora Duncan.

Stokes, together with Christine Jope-Slade, wrote the play Britannia of Billingsgate, which was produced by A. R. Whatmore at the St Martin's Theatre, London, on 30 November 1931 and made into a film of the same name, directed by Sinclair Hill, in 1933. Other screenwriting successes followed in 1934 with Rolling in Money, directed by Albert Parker, and in 1941 when Stokes co-wrote, with Lydia Hayward, the script for the film You Will Remember, directed by Jack Raymond. The film was based on the life of the popular late Victorian songwriter Leslie Stuart, played here by Robert Morley, and co-starred Emlyn Williams as Stuart's best friend.

Stokes co-wrote a series of plays with his brother, Leslie, beginning with Laura Garnett, whose main character had much in common with Isadora Duncan. The play was first performed at Dobbs Ferry, New York State, in July 1934 with Ethel Barrymore and later in the Arts Theatre Club, London, in September 1936 with Mary Clare playing the title role.

The Four Partners, a play in German by Jochen Huth, was adapted by Stokes and produced by Margaret Webster at London's Q Theatre in October 1936.

Oscar Wilde was the most successful of the Stokes brothers' plays and was based on the life of Oscar Wilde in which Wilde's friend, the controversial author and journalist Frank Harris, appears as a character. Starring Robert Morley, John Bryning and Frith Banbury, directed by Norman Marshall, the play had its first production at London's Gate Theatre Studio in 1936. Recast, with Francis L. Sullivan in the title role, it was revived at London's Arts Theatre Club in 1938. Because of its subject matter the play was not granted a licence by the Lord Chamberlain and could, therefore, only be staged in England at a theatre club where membership was required. There were no such problems in New York where the play opened the same year, again with Morley in the title role, on Broadway at the Fulton Theatre where it ran for 247 performances.

At that time Robert Morley was known in America only through his portrayal of Louis XVI, the French King, in the film Marie Antoinette and it was his success with the role of Wilde that launched his career as a stage actor on both sides of the Atlantic. The play, which contains much of Wilde's actual writings, opens in Algiers where Wilde and his friend Lord Alfred Douglas are on holiday together. They return to London for the opening of The Importance of Being Earnest and to attend Wilde's libel suit against the Marquess of Queensberry, Lord Alfred's father. Wilde's own trial and conviction follow and the play ends in Paris with his decline into alcoholism after his release from prison.

The Stokes brothers continued their collaboration with Out of Sight, a play about prison life, first presented at the Gate Theatre Studio on 4 March 1937 where it was directed by Norman Marshall and later the same year there was another production of the play at the Tavistock Little Theatre which was directed by Vincent Pearmain. Next came Frozen Glory, a play about polar exploration, first performed at the Gate Theatre Studio on 10 February 1938 where it was directed by A.E.Filmer.

From 1941 to 1945 he served as a probation officer at Bow Street Magistrates' Court, London, and in 1950 he wrote an autobiographical account of his experiences there, entitled Court Circular published in paperback by Pan Books. In 1952 the book was made into the film I Believe in You, directed by Basil Dearden & Michael Relph and starring Celia Johnson, Cecil Parker, Harry Fowler, Joan Collins and George Relph. Stokes described a tour through British prisons of the day in his book Come to Prison, published in 1957, and in 1965 his book Our Dear Delinquents, on a similar theme, was published.

Stokes was a friend of the actor Robert Morley and in 1953 wrote, Without Veils. The Intimate Biography of Gladys Cooper, about Morley's mother-in-law, the actress Gladys Cooper. Later, in 1966, he co-wrote a biography of Robert Morley himself entitled Robert Morley "Responsible Gentleman". The title alludes to the fact that Morley started his acting career as a "responsible gentleman", an actor who portrayed professional men such as doctors, lawyers and official receivers in bankruptcy cases.

In 1955 Stokes completed the novel, Beyond His Means, based on the life of Oscar Wilde. The film Oscar Wilde, based on the Stokes brothers' play, and directed by Gregory Ratoff, starred Robert Morley, Ralph Richardson, was released in 1960. This coincided with the release of The Trials of Oscar Wilde, a film directed by Ken Hughes, in which Peter Finch played the title role. The title of Stokes's memoir, Rarely Pure, published in 1952, was taken from the line "The truth is rarely pure and never simple" spoken by character Algernon Moncrieff in Oscar Wilde's play The Importance of Being Earnest. The memoir is subtitled "The Memoirs of a Young Man in Search of Sex".

Stokes worked as a screenplay advisor on Tony Richardson's films The Loneliness of the Long Distance Runner (1962), starring Tom Courtenay and Michael Redgrave, and on Tom Jones (1963), starring Albert Finney and Susannah York, and based on the novel of the same name by Henry Fielding.

== Works ==
=== Biographies & Essays ===
- Personal Glimpses (T. Werner Laurie, London, 1924)
- Isadora, an Intimate Portrait (Brentano's Ltd, New York, 1928)
- Pilloried! (D.Appleton & Co., New York, 1929)
- Hear the Lions Roar (H.Shaylor, London, 1931)
- Monologue (Hutchison, London, 1934)
- Court Circular (Michael Joseph, London, 1950)
- Rarely Pure (Peter Davis, London, 1952)
- Without Veils: the intimate biography of Gladys Cooper, introduction by Somerset Maugham (Peter Davis, London, 1953)
- Come to Prison (Longmans, London/New York, 1957)
- Our Dear Delinquents (Heineman, London, 1965)
- Robert Morley - Responsible Gentleman (with Robert Morley; Heineman, London, 1966)
- Robert Morley - A Reluctant Autobiography (with Robert Morley; Simon & Schuster, New York, 1967)
- Isadora, an Intimate Portrait (Panther, London, 1968)

=== Novels ===
- The Eternal Honeymoon, Leonard Parsons, London, 1927.
- Autumn Woman, Hutchison & Co., London, 1929.
- Laugh at My Weeping: a novel in four parts, Hutchison & Co., London, 1935.
- Recital in Paris, Peter Davis, London, 1954.
- Beyond His Means, Peter Davis, London,1955.
- A Clown in Clover, Peter Davis, London, 1956.
- Gastspiel in Paris: Roman, Zettner, Wŭrzburg:Wien, 1956.
- Ivar der Glückliche: Roman, Hera Verl., Wilhelmshaven, 1957.

=== Non-Fiction ===
- Robert Morley's Second Book of Bricks (with Robert Morley; Weidenfeld & Nicolson, London 1981) ISBN 0-297-77967-2

=== Plays ===
- Britannia of Billingsgate, a comedy in four acts, by Christine Jope-Slade and Sewell Stokes, Samuel French Ltd, French's Acting Edition No 194, London 1931.
- Laura Garnett, by Leslie & Sewell Stokes, A Play in Three Acts, 1934.
- The Four Partners, a Comedy in Three Acts, adapted from the German of Jochen Huth by Sewell Stokes, 1936.
- Out of Sight, by Leslie & Sewell Stokes, Secker & Warburg, London, 1937.
- Oscar Wilde, a play in 3 acts with a preface by Lord Alfred Douglas, by Leslie & Sewell Stokes, M. Secker & Warburg, London, 1937.
- Frozen Glory, by Leslie & Sewell Stokes, Secker & Warburg, London,1938.
- Half an Hour in Quod: a sketch, by Leslie & Sewell Stokes, Samuel French, London, 1938.
- Mother's Boy, A Comedy in Two Acts, starring David Tomlinson and Peggy Mount, 1964.

=== Films ===
- Britannia of Billingsgate (1932)
- Rolling in Money (1934)
- You Will Remember (1941)
- I Believe in You (1952)
- Oscar Wilde (1960)
- The Loneliness of the Long Distance Runner (1962)
- Tom Jones (1963)
- Isadora Duncan, the Biggest Dancer in the World (1966)
- Isadora (1968)

=== Articles & Letters ===
- Sheila Kaye-Smith Letters, 1909-1937 by Sheila Kaye-Smith & Sewell Stokes.
- The Story of J.M.B. by Sewell Stokes, Theatre Arts, Vol.XXV No.11, New York: Theatre Arts Inc, Nov 1941, pp 845–848.
- W.Somerset Maugham, by Sewell Stokes, Theatre Arts, 29, 94–100, New York, Feb.1945.
- A Conversation in Ebury Street by Sewell Stokes, The London Magazine, Nov. 1956.
