= Oscar Wilde (play) =

1936 play by Leslie and Sewell Stokes

- Original language: English
- Written by: Leslie Stokes; Sewell Stokes
- Characters: Oscar Wilde; Frank Harris; Lord Alfred Douglas
- Genre: Drama

Premiere
- Date: 1936

Oscar Wilde is a 1936 play written by Leslie Stokes and Sewell Stokes. It is based on the life of the Irish playwright Oscar Wilde in which Wilde's friend, the controversial author and journalist Frank Harris, appears as a character. The play, which contains much of Wilde's actual writings, starts with Wilde's literary success and his friendship with Lord Alfred Douglas, turns into a courtroom melodrama, and ends with Wilde as a broken alcoholic after two years in prison.

== Productions ==
Owing to the play's subject matter it was never granted a licence by the Lord Chamberlain and could, therefore, only be staged in England at a theatre club where membership was required. The play's first production at London's Gate Theatre Studio in 1936 starred Robert Morley as Wilde and was produced by Norman Marshall. Opening on 29 September, the play ran for six weeks and proved to be one of the theatre's most successful productions.

Later in New York in 1938, again with Morley in the title role, the play became a major award-winning success on Broadway at the Fulton Theatre where it opened on 10 October and ran for 247 performances, with Gladys Cooper's son, John Buckmaster, as Lord Alfred Douglas. This success launched Robert Morley's career as a stage actor on both sides of the Atlantic.

Coinciding with the Broadway production there was also a four-week revival in London at the Arts Theatre starring Francis L. Sullivan and produced by Ronald Adam, which opened on 25 October 1938. The play was revived again at the Bolton's Theatre Club, starring Frank Pettingell and directed by Leslie Stokes, in 1948.

== Adaptations ==
The film Oscar Wilde, based on the Stokes brothers' play with Robert Morley in the lead, was released in 1960.
