= Millie Walters Anson =

Portrait, miniatures and botanical artist

Minnie Walters Anson
- Born: 20 February 1875
- Died: 23 March 1959
- Education: Lambeth School of Art
- Known for: portraits, miniatures, botanical illustrations
- Notable work: 300 plates in Stebbing, M.E. (1934). Colour in The Garden (1st ed.), Princess Elizabeth (1927), Walter Adams (miniature)
- Spouse(s): Chris Adams, artist and photographer

Minnie Walters Anson (20 February 1875 – 23 March 1959) was a British portrait painter (in formal and informal styles) and created miniatures, as well as technical botanical illustrations, during the 1920s onwards.

== Education and life ==
Her art education was at Lambeth School of Art, London where she won awards. She lived at 8 Lewin Road and also 22 Kempshot Road, London. She married fellow artist, photographer, Chris Adams who had been commissioned to make paintings for Queen Mary's Doll's House. She died on 25 March 1959.

== Selected works ==
One of her miniatures (Walter Adams) is held in the archive of the Royal Society of Miniature Painters, Sculptors and Gravers. Anson's formal portrait of King George V and more relaxed subjects Dutch Bulb Merchant, A Breton Pilot and the semi-formal family portrait of an actress mother and child: Lady Neville Pearson (Gladys Cooper) and Sally are in the Russell-Cotes Art Gallery and Museum, Bournemouth.

In 2009, her multi-media portrait of Princess Elizabeth as a small child in 1927, was sold at auction, along with a 1925 two-view portrait of a young male actor in costume, along with thirteen detailed botanical studies of orchid flowers.

Anson was the illustrator of 300 plates in the 1934 book 'Colour in The Garden' by M.E. Stebbing. She worked on similar books or collections with Gertrude Jekyll and George F Tinley. And she painted postcard images, such as of Priory Mansions Hotel, Bournemouth.

Anson also painted Elizabeth Bowes-Lyon (the Queen Mother) as a young woman in 1937.

=== Collections ===
Anson's art is sold in private auctions but also examples of her work are held in the

- Russell-Cotes Art Gallery & Museum, Bournemouth
- Royal Society of Miniature Painters, Sculptors and Gravers, London
