= Larceny in Her Heart =

1946 film

- Theatrical release poster
- Directed by: Sam Newfield
- Screenplay by: Raymond L. Schrock
- Based on: Michael Shayne by Brett Halliday
- Produced by: Sigmund Neufeld
- Starring: Hugh Beaumont; Cheryl Walker; Ralph Dunn; Paul Bryar; Charles C. Wilson; Douglas Fowley; Gordon Richards
- Cinematography: Jack Greenhalgh
- Edited by: Holbrook N. Todd
- Music by: Leo Erdody
- Production company: Sigmund Neufeld Productions
- Distributed by: Producers Releasing Corporation
- Release date: July 10, 1946
- Running time: 68 minutes
- Country: United States
- Language: English

Larceny in Her Heart is a 1946 American crime film directed by Sam Newfield and written by Raymond L. Schrock. The film stars Hugh Beaumont, Cheryl Walker, Ralph Dunn, Paul Bryar, Charles C. Wilson, Douglas Fowley and Gordon Richards. It was released on July 10, 1946, by Producers Releasing Corporation.

== Plot ==
Civic crusader Burton Stallings hires private detective Michael Shayne to locate the former's missing step-daughter Helen, but Shayne finds himself in the frame when he later discovers the girl dead in his office/apartment. During the investigation he finds out that Stallings himself has had Helen confined in an asylum and that the dead girl was a ringer, all in order to obtain Helen's inheritance money before her 21st birthday.

== Cast ==
- Hugh Beaumont as Michael Shayne
- Cheryl Walker as Phyllis Hamilton
- Ralph Dunn as Sgt. Pete Rafferty
- Paul Bryar as Tim Rourke
- Charles C. Wilson as Chief Gentry
- Douglas Fowley as Doc Patterson
- Gordon Richards as Burton Stallings
- Charles Quigley as Arch Dubler
- Julia McMillan as Lucille
- Marie Hannon as Helen Stallings / Barbara Brett
- Lee Bennett as Whit Marlowe
- Henry Hall as Dr. Porter
