= Arts Theatre =

Theatre in London

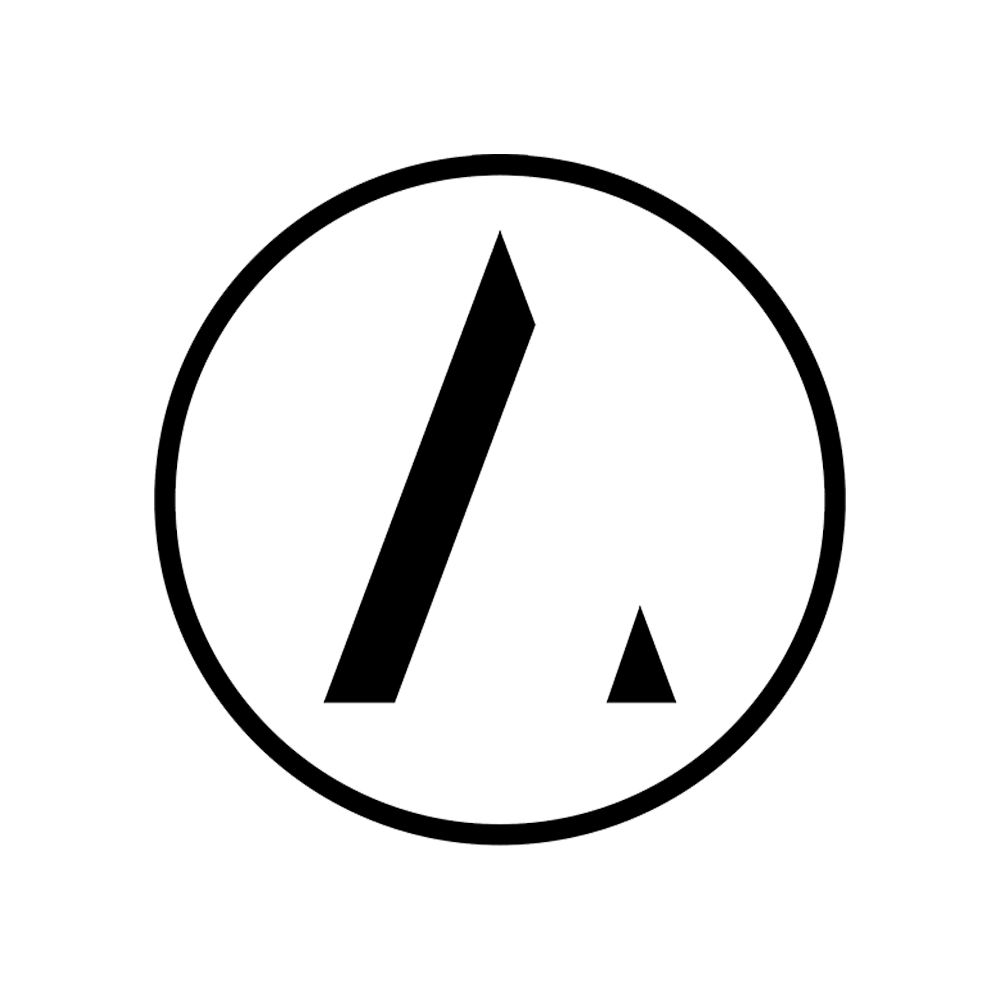
- Interactive map of Arts Theatre
- Address: Great Newport Street; London, WC2; United Kingdom
- Coordinates: 51.511944°N 0.1275°W
- Owner: Consolidated Development
- Operator: JJ Goodman Ltd.
- Capacity: 350
- Type: West End theatre
- Public transit: Leicester Square

Construction
- Opened: 20 April 1927; 99 years ago
- Architect: P. Morley Holder

Website
- www.artstheatrewestend.co.uk

The Arts Theatre is a theatre in Great Newport Street, in Westminster, Central London. It opened on April 20, 1927.

== History ==
It opened on 20 April 1927 as a members-only club for the performance of unlicensed plays, thus avoiding theatre censorship by the Lord Chamberlain's office. It was one of a small number of committed, independent theatre companies, including the Hampstead Everyman, the Gate Theatre Studio and the Q Theatre, which took risks by producing a diverse range of new and experimental plays, or plays that were thought to be commercially non-viable on the West End. The theatrical producer Norman Marshall referred to these as 'The Other Theatre' in his 1947 book of the same name.

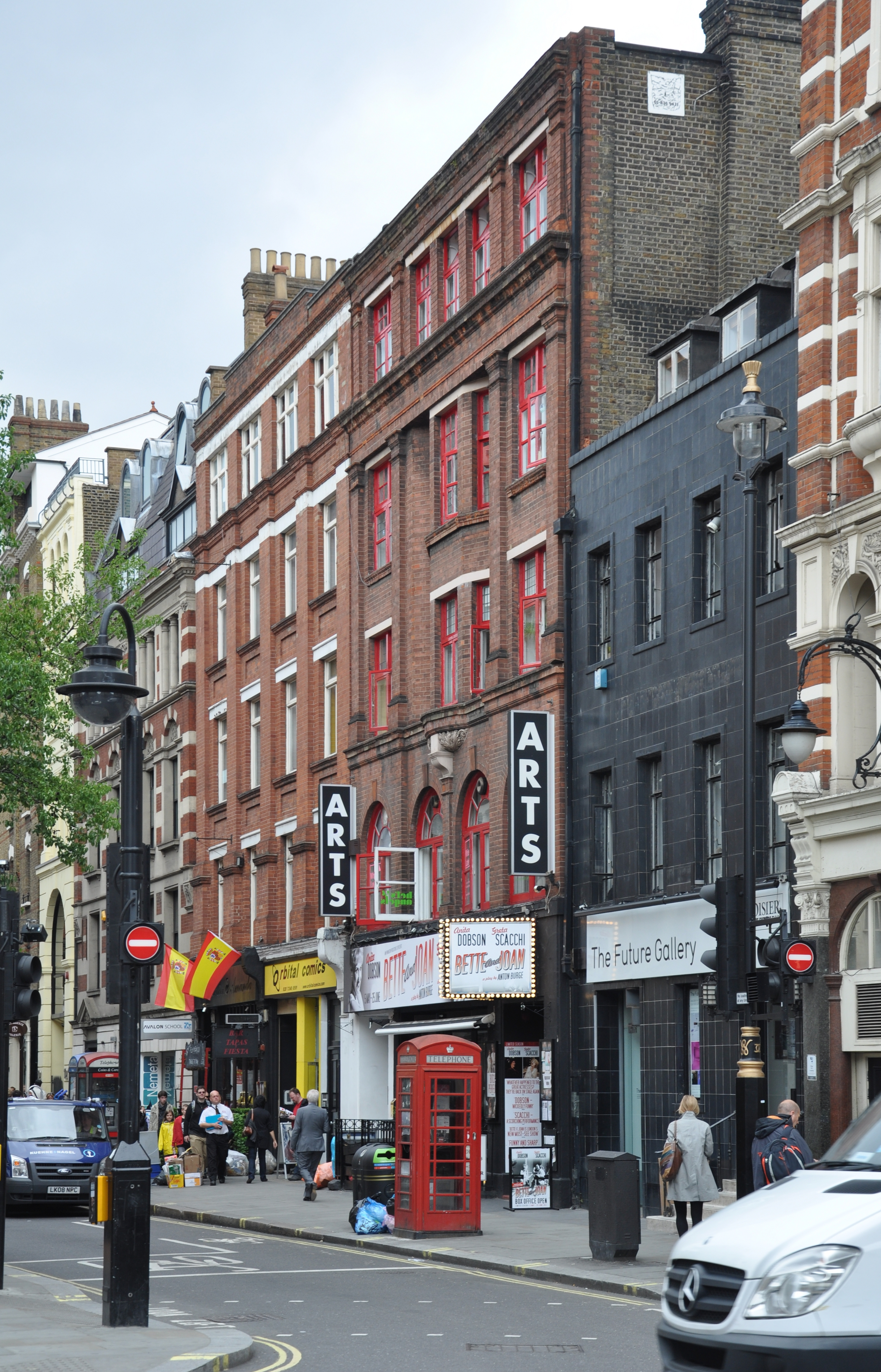
Arts Theatre in 2011

The theatre opened with a revue by Herbert Farjeon entitled Picnic, produced by Harold Scott and with music by Beverley Nichols. Its first important production was Young Woodley by John Van Druten, staged in 1928, which later transferred to the Savoy Theatre when the Lord Chamberlain's ban was lifted. In 1938, a four-week revival of the Stokes brothers' Oscar Wilde, starring Francis L. Sullivan and produced by Ronald Adam, opened on 25 October. This coincided with a Broadway production of the play. In 1940 the ballet La fête étrange was staged at the theatre, choreographed by Andrée Howard. It has subsequently been performed over 200 times by The Royal Ballet, and by Scottish Ballet.

In 1942, Alec Clunes and John Hanau took over the running of the theatre and for ten years produced a wide range of plays, winning a reputation as a 'pocket national theatre'. In 1946, Clunes teamed with author Peter Elstob to raise £20,000, which eventually put the theatre on a sound financial footing.

Ronnie Barker made his West End début at the production of Mourning Becomes Electra at the Arts Theatre in 1955 which was directed by Sir Peter Hall, with whom Barker had worked at the Oxford Playhouse. Barker remained a West End actor for some years, appearing in numerous plays between 1955 and 1968. These included two performances each night as he played a gypsy in Listen to the Wind at the Arts Theatre in 1955. In August 1955, aged 24, Hall directed the English-language premiere of Samuel Beckett's Waiting for Godot at the theatre. This was an important turning point in modern theatre for Britain. Subsequently, from 1956 to 1959, Hall ran the Arts Theatre.

Between April 1962 and January 1967 the Arts Theatre was known as the New Arts Theatre. Nat Cohen took over the lease.

From 1967 to 1999 the Arts also became a home for the Unicorn children's theatre, under the direction of its founder Caryl Jenner. She took over the lease, initially for six years. Meanwhile, adult performances continued in the evening, including Tom Stoppard's satirical double-bill Dirty Linen and New-Found-Land which, opening in June 1976, ran for four years at the Arts.

The theatre's lease was taken over by a consortium of UK and US producers in 2000 for a five-year period, and it was relaunched as a West End theatre with the anniversary production of Julian Mitchell's play Another Country, directed by Stephen Henry. Notable productions during this time included Closer to Heaven, the Jonathan Harvey/Pet Shop Boys musical, and The Vagina Monologues.

In 2011, the theatre was taken over by JJ Goodman and led by Artistic Director Mig Kimpton under the business management of Louis Hartshorn. The Arts now operates as the West End's smallest commercial receiving house, seating a maximum of 350 in a two-tier basement auditorium.

In 2014, Louis Hartshorn took over from Mig Kimpton as Executive Director and alongside long standing business partner Brian Hook as Producer. Expanding over an additional floor the Arts Theatre now houses two rehearsal rooms and a 60-capacity studio theatre 'Above the Arts'.

At the start of January 2026, The Arts Theatre closed for an extensive 2 year regeneration. Later that month it was announced that the Arts Theatre will be opening a new temporary venue on the Marble Arch roundabout called 'The Arts at Marble Arch'.

== Productions ==
- Toyer
- Saturday Night
- Shout!
- The Show Girls
- F**king Men
- Hotel Follies
- Catwalk Confidential
- Cymbeline
- Daisy Pulls It Off
- Nunsense A-Men
- Naked Boys Singing
- A Man of No Importance
- Party
- Oddsocks Present Romeo and Juliet
- Shirley Jones
- Wet Weather Cover
- The Complete Works of William Shakespeare (abridged)
- Lillies on the Land
- The Music of the Blues Brothers – A Tribute
- Park Avenue Cat
- Milked
- Oh My Goddess!
- The Female Edit
- Rosmersholm (with Marius Goring and Lucie Mannheim) - 1948
- Too True to Be Good (with Marius Goring and Lucie Mannheim) - 1948
- The Cherry Orchard (with Marius Goring) - 1948
- South – 1955
- The Children's Hour – 1955
- Templeton - 1958
- In White America – 1964
- Elegies – 7–14 November 2004
- A Guide to Sexual Misery – Jan to Apr 2011
- Woody Sez: The Life & Music of Woody Guthrie – Jan to Apr 2011
- Eve Ferret Sings – Mar 2011
- David Wood's Storytime – April 2011
- Face to Face at the Arts (series) (with Stephen Mangan) – May 2011
- Bette and Joan – May to Jun 2011
- Eve Ferret Sings Again – Jun 2011
- Seussical (with Stephen Flaherty and Lynn Ahrens) – Dec 2012
- The Tailor Made Man (with Faye Tozer, Mike McShane and Dylan Turner) – Feb to Apr 2013
- Seussical (with Stephen Flaherty and Lynn Ahrens) – Nov 2013
- Ghost Stories – February 2014 to March 2015
- Annie JR - August 2015
- USHERS: The Front of House Musical - October to November 2015
- The Blues Brothers: Xmas Special - November 2015 to January 2016
- All That Fall – April to May 2016
- A View from Islington North – May to July 2016
- American Idiot - July to November 2015, July to September 2016
- Murder Ballad – September to December 2016
- Rotterdam – 21st June – 15th July 2017
- I Loved Lucy - 19th July – 2nd September 2017
- Waiting for Godot - 5th September – 23rd September 2017
- Toxic Avenger – 28th September – 3rd December 2017
- Christmas Carol Simon Callow – 8th December 2016 – 7 January 2017
- Mischief Movie Night – 13th December – 27th January 2018
- Six (Mondays Run) - 18th December – 22nd January 2018
- All or Nothing – 6th February – 11th March 2018
- Ruthless – 16th March – 23rd June 2018
- Knights of the Rose - 29th June – 26th August 2018
- Six – 30th August – 14th October 2018
- The Wipers Times – 16th October – 1st December 2018
- Christmas Carol Simon Callow - 8th December – 12th January 2019
- Six – 17th January 2019 – 15th March 2020
- Oleanna – 21st July – 23rd October 2021
- Choir of Man – 29th October 2021 – 3rd April 2022
- Bonnie & Clyde – 9th April 2022 – 10th July 2022
- Bad Jews – 14th July – 25th September 2022
- The Queen’s Knickers – 8th August – 19th August 2022
- Choir of Man – 1st October 2022 – 31st December 2024
- QUEENZ: The Show with BALLS! – 1st December – 4th December 2022
- Irvine Welsh’s Porno – 29th October – 10th December 2023
- Austentatious – 5th November 2022 – 16th December 2024
- Father Christmas Needs a Wee! – 2nd December 2023 – 23rd December 2023
- Father Christmas Needs a Wee! – 7th December 2024 – 23rd December 2024
- Garry Starr: Classic Penguins – 2nd November – 14th December 2025
- Hold On To Your Butts – 7th April – 31st August 2025
- SVN in Concert – 1st December – 15th December 2025
- Father Christmas Needs a Wee! – 6th December 2025 – 24rd December 2025
