= Isadora Duncan, the Biggest Dancer in the World =

- Written by: Ken Russell; Sewell Stokes
- Directed by: Ken Russell
- Starring: Vivian Pickles; Peter Bowles; Alexei Jawdokimov; Murray Melvin; Jeanne Le Bars; Alita Naughton; Sandor Elès
- Country of origin: United Kingdom
- Original language: English

Production
- Producer: Ken Russell
- Cinematography: Dick Bush; Brian Tufano
- Editors: Michael Bradsell; Roger Crittenden
- Running time: 65 minutes 63 minutes (DVD version)
- Production company: BBC

Original release
- Network: BBC
- Release: 22 September 1966

Isadora Duncan, the Biggest Dancer in the World is a BBC Television film based on the life of the American dancer Isadora Duncan first broadcast on 22 September 1966. The film was directed and produced by Ken Russell and written by Sewell Stokes and Russell. It starred Vivian Pickles and Peter Bowles.

== Premise ==
The film is a biopic of American dancer Isadora Duncan.

== Cast ==
- Vivian Pickles as Isadora Duncan
- Peter Bowles as Paris Singer
- Alexei Jawdokimov as Sergei Yessenin
- Murray Melvin as Photographer
- Jeanne Le Bars as Wilma
- Alita Naughton as Journalist
- Sandor Elès as Bugatti
- Michael Palin as Jazz Band Undertaker (uncredited)
- Eric Idle as Jazz Band Chauffeur (uncredited)

== Production ==
Sewell Stokes, a friend of the dancer towards the very end of her life when she was penniless and alone, wrote a memoir of his conversations with her, shortly after her death, entitled Isadora, an Intimate Portrait (1928). He narrates this film. Two years after the first broadcast of the TV film, Vanessa Redgrave played the role of Isadora Duncan in the big-screen biopic Isadora.

Russell's biographer Joseph Lanza believes that "of all his television work, Isadora is his most accomplished". It explores his "ongoing theme of art being a thing of both glory and vulgarity"

== Reception ==
Bill Gibron from DVD Talk gave the film a positive review and stated: "Herself trained as a dancer, Pickles lights up the screen when she's onstage, Duncan's inflated ego disappearing into a series of carefully choreographed interpretations. Still, some might find the constant confrontations and shouting matches tiring. After all, Russell makes it clear that this was one artist who could have had it all had she just kept her mighty yap shut. Because she didn't, however, we see her downfall in all its brazen glory."

Michael Brooke, in his article for the BFI's Screenonline website describes Pickles' performance as a "gloriously vulgar incarnation".
