= Gate Theatre Studio =

Former studio theatre in London, England (1927–1941)

- Gate Theatre Salon
- Interactive map of Gate Theatre Studio
- Address: Villiers Street; London, WC2; United Kingdom
- Coordinates: 51.5081°N 0.1238°W
- Type: Studio theatre
- Public transit: Charing Cross; Embankment; Charing Cross

Construction
- Opened: 22 November 1927
- Closed: 1941

Gate Theatre Studio, often referred to as simply the Gate Theatre, is a former independent theatre on Villiers Street in London.

== History ==
Founded in October 1925 by Peter Godfrey and his wife Molly Veness, the theatre was originally on the top floor of a ramshackle warehouse at 38 Floral Street, Covent Garden and could hold an audience of 96. Then known as "the Gate Theatre Salon" (The Gate to Better Things), it opened that year on 30 October with Godfrey's production of Susan Glaspell's Berenice, starring Veness as Margaret, 'the searcher for truth', and ran for a fortnight.

With a series of challenging productions, including August Strindberg's The Dance of Death, the Gate struggled to survive without attracting any particular attention. The history of the studio was typical of many small independent theatres of the period, until the Sunday Times critic James Agate, enthusiastically reviewed Georg Kaiser's From Morn to Midnight and urged readers to apply for membership of the theatre and go and see the production. At the end of a scheduled three-week run, the play was transferred to the Regent Theatre in King's Cross when Claude Rains took over the leading role from Godfrey.

In March 1927 the Gate Theatre Salon closed and the company moved to a site at 16A Villiers Street,'underneath the arches' close to Charing Cross Station. Peter Godfrey entered into a new business partnership with Miss Velona Pilcher. The new Gate Theatre Studio was constructed out of a complex of premises acquired by Carlo Gatti which included Gatti's Underneath the Arches Musical Hall (now the Players' Theatre). Reconstruction delayed the first two productions of the third season which were given at the Rudolph Steiner Theatre. It was not until 22 November 1927 that the newly named Gate Theatre Studio opened with Maya, a play by Simon Gantillon, with Gwen Ffrangcon-Davies in the lead, again produced by Godfrey and receiving 53 performances.

By 1934, Godfrey, a man grown tired of shouldering the administrative burden of a theatre, handed it over to a new company formed by Norman Marshall, who took over and refurbished the Gate Theatre Studio, reviving the theatre's reputation, often financing his productions by running highly successful theatrical revues in parallel.

=== West End transfers ===
Productions, several of which transferred to the West End following censorship troubles with the Lord Chamberlain, included Oscar Wilde's Salome (1931), Laurence Housman's Victoria Regina (1935), Elsie Schauffler's Parnell (1936), Lillian Hellman's The Children's Hour (1936), John Steinbeck's Of Mice and Men (1939) and Reginald Beckwith's Boys in Brown (1940). In 1936 the young Robert Morley, played the lead in the Stokes brothers' Oscar Wilde and later took the play to Broadway.

=== The Other Theatre ===
In the 1930s The Gate Theatre Studio was one of a number of small, committed, independent theatre companies which included the Hampstead Everyman, the Arts Theatre Club and Q Theatre at Kew Bridge. These theatres were able to avoid the Lord Chamberlain's censorship by operating as theatre clubs, where membership was obligatory, and took risks by producing new and experimental plays, or plays by unknown or commercially unviable writers. Norman Marshall refers to these as ‘The Other Theatre’ in his 1947 book of the same name.

=== Bomb damage in World War II ===
The Gate Revues, several starring Hermione Gingold who made her first professional appearance at the Gate, restored intimate revue to favour in the West End. However following serious bomb damage in 1941, the same air raid that destroyed the Little Theatre in the Adelphi, the theatre was finally forced to close. It was never to re-open although, according to Norman Marshall, the manpower and material needed to resuscitate it would have been very small.
