= Fulton Theatre =

Former theatre in Manhattan, New York

- Folies-Bergere, Helen Hayes Theatre
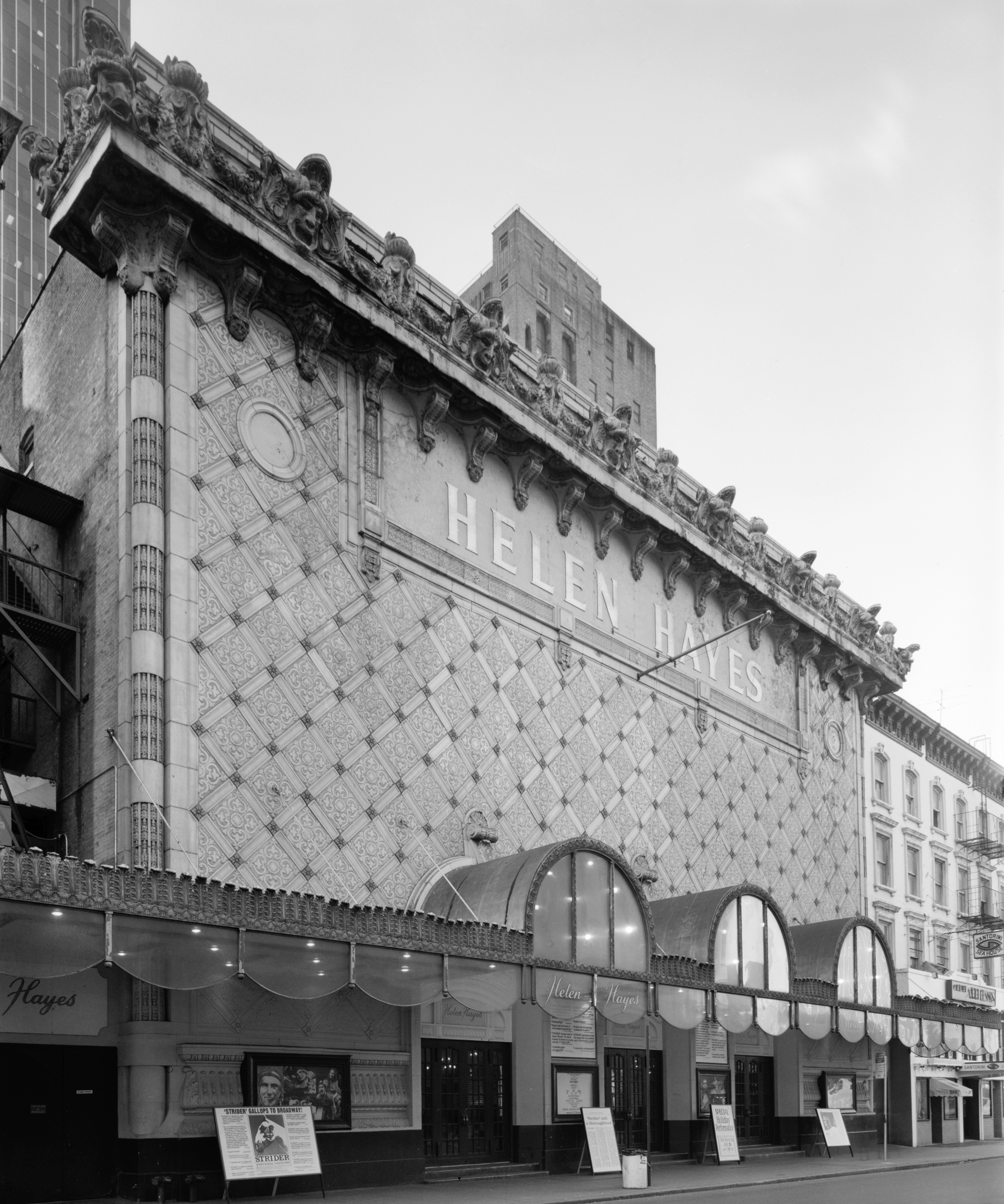
- Helen Hayes (originally Fulton) Theatre, circa 1980

- Location in Manhattan Location in New York City
- Address: 210 West 46th Street; New York City; United States
- Coordinates: 40.7587°N 73.9856°W
- Type: Broadway

Construction
- Opened: April 27, 1911
- Reopened: October 20, 1911
- Demolished: 1982
- Architect: Herts & Tallant

The Fulton Theatre was a Broadway theatre located at 210 West 46th Street in Manhattan, New York City. It opened as the Folies-Bergere in 1911. It was renamed the Helen Hayes Theatre in 1955. The theatre was demolished in 1982. After the former Little Theatre on 44th Street became the current Helen Hayes Theatre, the Fulton Theatre was sometimes referred to as the First Helen Hayes Theatre.

== History ==
Built by the architects Herts & Tallant for Henry B. Harris and Jesse Lasky, it was originally opened on April 27, 1911, under the name Folies-Bergere as a dinner theatre with vaudeville. The building featured three murals and a color scheme by leading American muralist William de Leftwich Dodge. Eighteen-year-old Mae West was discovered here by The New York Times at her Broadway debut on September 22, 1911. Closing after that, the theatre reopened on October 20, 1911, as the Fulton Theatre, a conventional playhouse. The theatre was managed by Abraham L. Erlanger from 1921, until his death in 1930.

In 1955, the theatre was renamed the Helen Hayes Theatre in honor of the renowned actress Helen Hayes and re-opened under that name on November 21.

In 1982, the theatre was demolished, along with the Morosco, Bijou, Gaiety and Astor Theatres, to make way for the Marriott Marquis Hotel, which now houses the Marquis Theatre. Parts of the Helen Hayes Theatre were salvaged before the theatre's demolition and were used to build the Shakespeare Center, home of the Riverside Shakespeare Company on the Upper West Side, which was dedicated by Hayes and Joseph Papp in September 1982.

Since Helen Hayes was still living at the time of her namesake theater's demolition, the nearby Little Theatre at 240 West 44th Street was renamed in her honor in 1983.

== Performers ==
Besides Mae West, the Fulton has also had English actor Robert Morley in the title role of the play Oscar Wilde by Leslie and Sewell Stokes in 1938. The play ran for 247 performances and its success launched Morley's career as a stage actor on both sides of the Atlantic.

Audrey Hepburn starred in the Gilbert Miller production of Gigi, which opened at the Fulton on November 24, 1951, and ran for 219 performances.

== Selected runs ==
Notable runs in excess of 100 performances include:

- The Misleading Lady (1913–14)
- Twin Beds (1914–15)
- Words and Music (1917-18)
- Abie's Irish Rose (1922) (moved to Theatre Republic through 1927)
- Orange Blossoms (1922)
- He Who Gets Slapped (1922)
- Secrets (1922–23)
- Puzzles of 1925 (1925)
- The Jazz Singer (1925–26) (which led to the 1927 film)
- The Donovan Affair (1926)
- Oh, Please! (1926–27)
- Dracula (Oct 1927-May 1928)
- Gambling (Aug 1929 - Jan 1930) (152 perf.)
- New Faces of 1934 (Mar 1934 - June 1934)
- Oscar Wilde (Oct 1938 - May 1939) (247 perf.)
- Arsenic and Old Lace (Jan 1941 - Sept 1943) (then moved to Hudson Theatre)
- The Searching Wind (Apr 1944 - Jan 1945) (318 perf.)
- Another Part of the Forest (Nov 1946 - Apr 1947) (182 perf.)
- Command Decision (Oct 1947 - Sept 1948) (409 perf.)
- Goodbye, Mr. Fancy (Feb 1949 - Sept 1949) (started at Morosco Theatre, moved to Martin Beck Theatre)
- Gigi (Nov 1951 - May 1952) (219 perf.)
- The Seven Year Itch (Nov 1952 - Aug 1955) (1141 perf.)

As Helen Hayes Theatre:

- Long Day's Journey into Night (Nov 1956 - Mar 1958) (390 perf.)
- A Touch of the Poet (Oct 1958 - Jun 1959) (284 perf.)
- Period of Adjustment (Nov 1960 - Mar 1961) (132 perf.)
- Mary, Mary (Mar 1961 - Nov 1964) (then briefly to Morosco Theatre)
- Philadelphia, Here I Come! (Feb 1966 - Oct 1966) (326 perf.)
- The Prime of Miss Jean Brodie (Jan 1968 - Dec 1968) (379 perf.)
- Hadrian VII (Jan 1969 - Nov 1969) (359 perf.)
- The Crucifer of Blood (Sept 1978 - Apr 1979) (236 perf.)
- Strider (Nov 1979 - May 1980) (214 perf.)

== See also ==
- List of Broadway theaters#Demolished Broadway theaters
