= I Believe in You (film) =

1952 British drama by Michael Relph and Basil Dearden

- Directed by: Basil Dearden; Michael Relph
- Written by: Basil Dearden; Nicholas Phipps; Michael Relph; Jack Whittingham
- Produced by: Michael Relph; Basil Dearden
- Starring: Celia Johnson; Cecil Parker; Joan Collins
- Cinematography: Gordon Dines
- Edited by: Peter Tanner
- Music by: Ernest Irving
- Production company: Ealing Studios
- Distributed by: General Film Distributors
- Release date: 5 March 1952
- Running time: 95 minutes
- Country: United Kingdom
- Language: English
- Box office: £89,000

I Believe in You is a 1952 British drama film directed by Michael Relph and Basil Dearden, starring Celia Johnson and Cecil Parker and is based on the book Court Circular by Sewell Stokes. Inspired by the recently successful The Blue Lamp (1950), Relph and Dearden used a semi-documentary approach in telling the story of the lives of probation officers and their charges.

== Plot ==
Henry Phipps, a retired Colonial civil servant, takes on the job of a probation officer, and finds it a challenge. Various characters' lives are examined as Phipps and his colleagues attempt to reform (amongst others), a hardened criminal and a juvenile delinquent.

== Cast ==
- Celia Johnson as Matty Matheson
- Cecil Parker as Henry Phipps
- Godfrey Tearle as Judge Pyke
- Harry Fowler as Charlie Hooker
- George Relph as Mr. Dove
- Joan Collins as Norma Hart
- Laurence Harvey as Jordie Bennett
- Ernest Jay as Judge Quayle
- Ursula Howells as Hon Ursula
- Sid James as Sergeant Body
- Katie Johnson as Miss Mackline
- Ada Reeve as Mrs Crockett
- Brenda de Banzie as Mrs Hooker
- Alex McCrindle as Tom Haines
- Laurence Naismith as Sergeant Braxton
- Gladys Henson as Mrs Stevens
- Richard Hart as Eric Stevens
- Stanley Escane as Buck Wilson
- Fred Griffiths as Fred Crump
- David Hannaford as Braxton Child
- Judith Furse as Policewoman Jones
- Mandy Miller as child
- Glyn Houston as man giving directions

== Production ==
Maurice Carter claims he helped Joan Collins get cast in the lead. "I was in Pinewood and she was with Reed, Maxwell Reed, in the restaurant and I thought gosh that's a super looking girl. They were trying to cast a girl for the part so I saw Basil in the bar and said 'I've just seen a super looking girl, have you thought about her for the part she might be something'." Michael Relph took credit for pushing her on the director.

Carter recalled Collins had a difficult time during the shoot as she was "terrified" of Maxwell Reed. "He was mistreating her sexually and at the same time everybody had this sexual thing about her. Michael Relph was absolutely mad to get that this girl. In fact he batted down her dressing room to get in, it was real rough stuff... At Ealing Studios of all places, with Michael Balcon around. And she used to come and sit at my table and say can I sit at your table, otherwise he'll come and sit with me and I can't stand it at lunchtime, I'll be sick... She was terrified. It went on and on."

== Critical reception ==
Monthly Film Bulletin said "This film does for the probation officer what The Blue Lamp did for the policeman, and in much the same manner. The ingredients combine sentiment, comedy and some artificial melodrama in casily assimilated proportions, the manner is episodic, the technique has the smooth, journalistic proficiency that one expects from Basil Dearden – continually on the move, never penetrating far beneath the surface of a situation. Through the office pass eccentric old women (including that familiar figure, the elderly lunatic who thinks that the neighbours are poisoning her cat), drunks, delinquents, the reformable and the hard cases. The relationships between the main characters are stated rather than explored (Norma and Hooker, in particular, are types rather than individuals) but the script continually shifts attention away from the principals to the chorus."

In British Sound Films: The Studio Years 1928–1959 David Quinlan rated the film as "good", writing: "Rather cosy view of its subject, but interesting and entertaining."

Leslie Halliwell said: "Watchable and reasonable but not very compelling."

The Radio Times Guide to Films gave the film 3/5 stars, writing: "Michael Relph and Basil Dearden ladle on the good intentions in this unusual drama about the probation service, only to spoil everything by emphasising the patronising conceit that the proletariat will always be ignorant neer-do-wells without the guiding influence of the kindly middle classes. Cecil Parker turns from a bumbling do-gooder into a hard-nosed champion of the underprivileged as he helps Harry Fowler and Joan Collins to stumble back on to the straight and narrow. Incapable of giving a bad performance, Celia Johnson is sidelined once Parker finds his feet."

The New York Times wrote, "it shines with understanding and, except for a brash climactic moment, it is a warm and adult adventure, which pins deserving medals on unsung heroes without heroics."

Allmovie wrote, "the semi-documentary approach established early in I Believe in You gives way to sentiment as the film winds down."

TV Guide noted, "an engaging drama with surprisingly good performances from (Joan) Collins, (Harry) Fowler, and (Laurence) Harvey."
