= Oscar Wilde (film) =

- Directed by: Gregory Ratoff
- Written by: Jo Eisinger
- Based on: Oscar Wilde by Leslie Stokes & Sewell Stokes
- Produced by: William Kirby
- Starring: Robert Morley; Ralph Richardson; Phyllis Calvert; John Neville
- Cinematography: Georges Périnal
- Edited by: Antony Gibbs
- Music by: Kenneth V. Jones
- Distributed by: 20th Century Fox
- Release date: 22 May 1960
- Running time: 98 minutes
- Country: United Kingdom
- Language: English
- Budget: $250,000

Oscar Wilde is a 1960 biographical film about Oscar Wilde, made by Vantage Films and released by 20th Century Fox. The film was directed by Gregory Ratoff and produced by William Kirby, from a screenplay by Jo Eisinger, based on the play Oscar Wilde by Leslie Stokes and Sewell Stokes. The film starred Robert Morley (as Oscar Wilde), Ralph Richardson, Phyllis Calvert and Alexander Knox.

== Plot ==
The plot primarily focuses on the litigation surrounding Wilde's libel suit against the Marquess of Queensberry, and the subsequent accusation of Wilde's homosexuality.

== Cast ==
- Robert Morley as Oscar Wilde
- Ralph Richardson as Sir Edward Carson
- Phyllis Calvert as Constance Wilde
- John Neville as Lord Alfred Douglas
- Alexander Knox as Sir Edward Clarke
- Dennis Price as Robbie Ross
- Edward Chapman as the Marquess of Queensberry
- Martin Benson as George Alexander

== Production ==
This was one of two films about Wilde released in 1960, the other being The Trials of Oscar Wilde. They were both released in the last week of May 1960.

Author and former film extra Brian Edward Hurst gives a detailed description of a scene he witnessed during filming where Morley (as Wilde) attempted to pick up a newspaper boy on a foggy London street. Hurst's book: Heaven Can Help – the Autobiography of a Medium describes the day's filming at Walton Studios. The attempted seduction scene was cut from the final version.

This film was a lower budget production which was compared unfavourably with the wide-screen, technicolor The Trials of Oscar Wilde.

== Release ==
The film had a charity gala at the Carlton on 22 May 1960.

== Critical reception ==
Bosley Crowther of The New York Times wrote, "A second British film on this subject, "The Trials of Oscar Wilde," will open here next week. It will be interesting to compare it with this somewhat less than satisfactory one."
