= Checkmate (1935 film) =

British film by George William Pearson

- Directed by: George Pearson
- Screenplay by: Basil Mason
- Produced by: Anthony Havelock-Allan
- Starring: Maurice Evans; Felix Aylmer; Evelyn Foster
- Production company: British and Dominions Film Corporation
- Release date: 24 February 1936
- Running time: 67 minutes
- Country: United Kingdom
- Language: English

Checkmate is a 1935 British crime film directed by George Pearson and starring Maurice Evans, Felix Aylmer and Evelyn Foster. It was written by Basil Mason based on a novel by Amy Kennedy Gould.

== Plot ==
Phillip Allen is Scotland Yard detective, hunting down a gang of jewel thieves in London. After they are captured, he marries the gang leader's daughter.

== Cast ==
- Maurice Evans as Phillip Allen
- Felix Aylmer as Henry Nicholls
- Evelyn Foster as Mary Nicholls
- Sally Gray as Jean Nicholls
- Donald Wolfit as Jack Barton
- Wilfrid Caithness as Inspector Smith
- Percy Walsh as Mr. Curtail
- Ernest Jay as Huntly
- John Buckmaster as Mike Doyle

== Production ==
The film was made at Boreham Wood Studios.

== Reception ==
The Monthly Film Bulletin wrote: "The story is convincing and moves but it is clumsily developed. Comedy and romance are adequately handled. Characterisation and acting are good; Maurice Evans makes the most of his part. The dialogue is uneven."

Kine Weekly wrote: "An unpretentious essay in crime, this picture misses the boat because of unimaginative treatment. The story is not at all bad, it can honestly lay claim to invention, nor is the acting: but poor direction, resulting in frequent ridiculous emphasis of the obvious, seriously damages dramatic effect. Unsolicited laughs put the picture low down in the supporting feature category. A quota booking for the unsophisticated."
