= Rolling in Money =

1934 film

- Trade advertisement
- Directed by: Albert Parker
- Written by: Frank Atkinson; R. J. Davis; Sewell Stokes
- Based on: Mr. Hopkinson by R. C. Carton
- Produced by: John Barrow
- Starring: Isabel Jeans; Leslie Sarony; John Loder
- Production company: Fox Film
- Distributed by: Fox Film
- Release date: 22 March 1934
- Running time: 85 minutes
- Country: United Kingdom
- Language: English

Rolling in Money is a 1934 British comedy film directed by Albert Parker and starring Isabel Jeans, Leslie Sarony and John Loder. It was written by Frank Atkinson, R. J. Davis and Sewell Stokes was an adaptation of the 1905 play Mr. Hopkinson by R. C. Carton. It was made at Ealing Studios by the British subsidiary of Fox Film. It was not a quota quickie like much of the subsidiary's output at the time.

== Preservation status ==
The British Film Institute National Archive holds a collection of ephemera and stills but no film or video materials.

== Synopsis ==
The screenplay concerns an impoverished duchess who arranges a marriage for her daughter to a wealthy working-class London barber.

== Cast ==
- Isabel Jeans as Duchess of Braceborough
- Leslie Sarony as Hopkinson
- John Loder as Lord Gawthorpe
- Horace Hodges as Earl of Addleton
- Lawrence Grossmith as Duke of Braceborough
- Garry Marsh as Dursingham
- Anna Lee as Lady Eggleby
- René Ray as Eliza Dibbs
- C. M. Hallard as Carter
- Frank Atkinson as Wiggins

== Reception ==
Kine Weekly wrote: "This farcical comedy is not at all badly acted and presented, but it contains far too much talk and develops into a shouting match, the roar of which becomes rather exhausting. In between the babble, however, popular humour is discernible, and it is this which carries the film into the programme class. ...This comedy certainly has an idea, and the working out of the plot reveals a good sense of the theatre."

The Daily Film Renter wrote: "Story sometimes obscure, but recognizable theme amusing. Picture seriously hampered by slow action. Chiefly notable for acting, although players' talents are frequently submerged. Leslie Sarony backbone of proceedings. Severely cut, may pull its weight in those halls where audiences care little for subtleties. ... Obviously a farce, its pace should have been quicker. Intrinsically, the show is amusing, but it spends far too much time up the side-alleys, and even when it stays put for a while its situations strike one as being forced and artificial."
