= The Trials of Oscar Wilde =

1960 film by Ken Hughes

- Directed by: Ken Hughes
- Screenplay by: Montgomery Hyde; Ken Hughes
- Based on: The Stringed Lute by John Furnell
- Produced by: Harold Huth
- Starring: Peter Finch; Yvonne Mitchell; James Mason; Nigel Patrick; Lionel Jeffries; John Fraser
- Cinematography: Ted Moore
- Edited by: Geoffrey Foot
- Music by: Ron Goodwin
- Production company: Warwick Films
- Distributed by: Eros Films
- Release date: 28 May 1960 (London)
- Running time: 123 minutes
- Country: United Kingdom
- Language: English
- Budget: £270,000 or £296,500

The Trials of Oscar Wilde, also known as The Man with the Green Carnation and The Green Carnation, is a 1960 British drama film based on the libel and subsequent criminal cases involving Oscar Wilde and the Marquess of Queensberry. It was written by Ken Hughes, directed by Hughes, and produced by Harold Huth. The screenplay was by Ken Hughes and Montgomery Hyde, based on an unperformed play The Stringed Lute by John Furnell (the pseudonym of Phyllis Macqueen, second wife of Basil Cameron). The film was made by Warwick Films and released by Eros Films and has been called the best film ever made by Warwick or Ken Hughes.

It stars Peter Finch as Wilde, Lionel Jeffries as Queensberry, and John Fraser as Bosie (Lord Alfred Douglas) with James Mason, Nigel Patrick, Yvonne Mitchell, Maxine Audley, Paul Rogers and James Booth.

== Cast ==
- Peter Finch as Oscar Wilde
- Yvonne Mitchell as Constance Wilde
- Sonia Dresdel as Lady Wilde
- Emrys Jones as Robbie Ross
- Lionel Jeffries as Marquis of Queensbury
- James Mason as Sir Edward Carson
- Nigel Patrick as Sir Edward Clarke
- John Fraser as Lord Alfred Douglas
- Maxine Audley as Ada Leverson
- Ian Fleming as Arthur
- Laurence Naismith as the Prince of Wales
- James Booth as Alfred Wood
- Michael Goodliffe as Charles Gill
- Naomi Chance as Lillie Langtry

== Production ==
In November 1959, Ken Hughes said he hoped for Laurence Olivier or Alec Guinness to play the title role. "I know American actors who would run a mile rather than play a part like this, but the film will be a flop unless Wilde is played by someone of stature," said Hughes. "We are going to have some stiff legal problems. We shall approach the Queensberry family. The Marquis will be shown as the villain and I don't know how his family will like that. As for Wilde, the film will show him deserving pity, a genius living in a superficial fantasy world."

Vyvyan Holland (Wilde's son) said "the film company has not approached me. I should be very glad to act as advisor although I cannot say I would approve until I have seen the script".

In February 1960, it was announced Peter Finch would play the role for a fee of £25,000. "I'm scared stiff," said Finch. "Mind you the fact it's such a challenge is one reason I'm so keen. It's exciting to do something everybody says you can't."

The production was filmed in Technirama. The movie was an anomaly among the output of Warwick Productions which specialised in action films.

== Oscar Wilde Lawsuits ==
It was one of two films about Wilde released in 1960, the other being 20th Century Fox's Oscar Wilde starring Robert Morley. According to production designer Ken Adam, producer Irving Allen set up four editing rooms for the production, working in parallel during principal photography; this meant that the film could be screened in the West End seven weeks after the start of filming.

Warwick took out an injunction against the makers of Oscar Wilde claiming copyright infringement in two books. The claim was unsuccessful.

== Release ==
The film was released at midnight on Saturday, 28 May 1960 at Studio One in London before its general release on 30 May 1960. It was released a week after Oscar Wilde. Producers of both films originally refused to change their movie titles. Eventually, after confusion at various cinemas, Warwick announced they would release The Trials of Oscar Wilde as The Green Carnation.

In June 1960 Warwick announced it would not make films through major studios but would produce and distribute films itself with a slate of pictures worth $8 million a year: "three big films a year" plus eight others which it would finance through Eros (that would cost an estimated $3 million all up). Eros would distribute The Trials of Oscar Wilde in the UK.

In May 1961 Eros ran into financial difficulties, while distributing The Trials of Oscar Wilde and several staff were fired. Four films were awaiting distribution - Johnny Nobody, Middle of Nowhere, Carolina and Lies My Father Told Me.

== Reception ==
=== Critical ===
In his review of the film, Bosley Crowther wrote: "Mr. Wilde himself could not have expected his rare personality or his unfortunate encounters with British justice on a morals charge to have been more sympathetically or affectingly dramatized. In comparison to that other British picture about the same subject that opened [in New York City] last week, this one is more impressive in every respect, save one." Crowther concludes the review saying "The only thing is you wonder if this is a fairly true account, if Mr. Wilde was as noble and heroic as he is made to appear. And if he was, what was he doing with those cheap and shady young men? It looks to us as if they are trying to whitewash a most unpleasant case, which is one of the more notorious and less ennobling in literary history."

John Simon described The Trials of Oscar Wilde as "an unjustly neglected movie".

Variety magazine, commenting on the performances, said "Peter Finch gives a moving and subtle performance as the ill-starred playwright. Before his downfall he gives the man the charm that he undoubtedly had....John Fraser as handsome young Lord Alfred Douglas is suitably vain, selfish, vindictive and petulant and the relationship between the two is more understandable. Where Trials suffers in comparison with the B&W film is in the remarkable impact of the libel case court sequence. James Mason never provides the strength and bitter logic necessary for the dramatic cut-and-thrust when Wilde is in the witness box."

The film has been called "Hughes' one undeniable classic."

=== Box office ===
Kine Weekly called it a "money maker" at the British box office in 1960. The magazine elaborated that the film "did marvelously in good and high class halls but faltered a bit in industrial areas. All the same it's one of the outstanding productions of 1960."

=== Accolades ===
Award	Category	Nominee(s)	Result	Ref.
British Academy Film Awards	Best Film from any Source	Ken Hughes	Nominated	
British Academy Film Awards	Best British Film	Ken Hughes	Nominated	
British Academy Film Awards	Best British Actor	Peter Finch	Won	
British Academy Film Awards	Best British Actor	John Fraser	Nominated	
British Academy Film Awards	Best British Screenplay	Ken Hughes	Nominated	
Golden Globe Awards	Best English-Language Foreign Film		Won	
Moscow International Film Festival	Grand Prix	Ken Hughes	Nominated	
Moscow International Film Festival	Best Actor	Peter Finch	Won	
Moscow International Film Festival	Best Decorator	Bill Constable	Won	
Moscow International Film Festival	Best Costume Designer	Terence Morgan	Won	

== Influence ==
The film was the inspiration for a promotional film made for the Rolling Stones song "We Love You"; the 1967 film, directed by Peter Whitehead, featured Mick Jagger as Wilde, Keith Richards as the judge in the Wilde trial, and Marianne Faithfull as Bosie.

== See also ==
- Gross Indecency: The Three Trials of Oscar Wilde, 1997 play based on the same legal proceedings
