= Leslie Stokes =

English playwright, BBC radio producer and director

- Born: United Kingdom
- Died: United Kingdom
- Occupations: Playwright, radio producer
- Notable work: Oscar Wilde
- Relatives: Sewell Stokes

Leslie Stokes was an English playwright and a BBC radio producer and director.

As a young man Leslie Stokes was an actor and later became a playwright and BBC radio producer and director. Together with his brother, author and playwright Sewell Stokes, he co-wrote a number of plays, including the success Oscar Wilde, starring Robert Morley as Wilde. It was this play which launched Robert Morley's career as a stage actor on both sides of the Atlantic. The film Oscar Wilde (1960) was based on the Stokes brothers' play.
