= Robert Morley =

English actor (1908–1992)

Robert Morley CBE
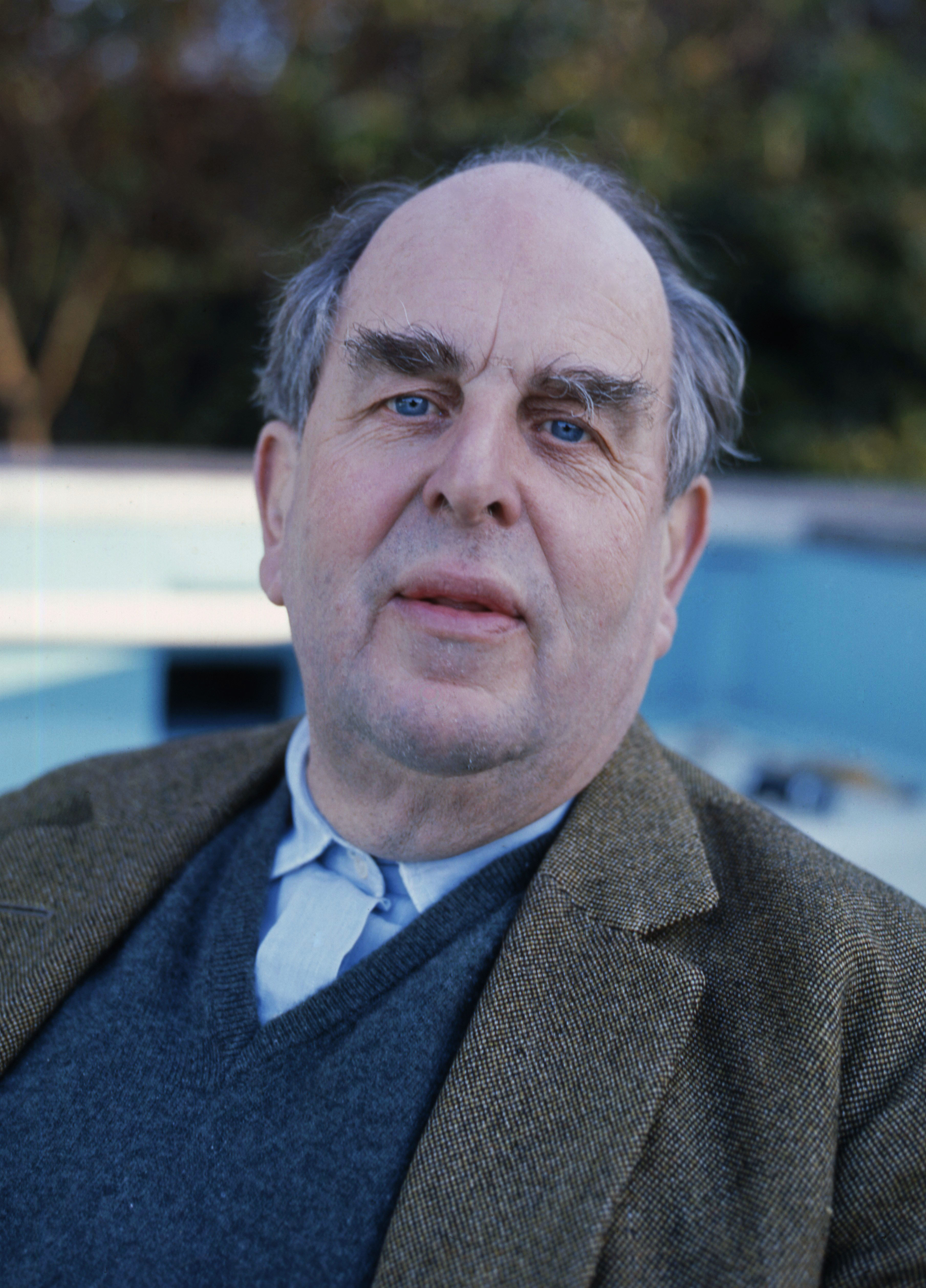
- Morley in 1975
- Born: Robert Adolph Wilton Morley; 26 May 1908; Semley, Wiltshire, England
- Died: 3 June 1992 (aged 84); Reading, Berkshire, England
- Occupations: Actor; playwright; screenwriter
- Years active: 1928–1989
- Spouse: Joan Buckmaster (m. 1940)
- Children: 3

Robert Adolph Wilton Morley (26 May 1908 – 3 June 1992) was a British actor who enjoyed a lengthy career in both Britain and the United States. He was frequently cast as a pompous English gentleman representing the Establishment, often in supporting roles. In 1939 he received an Academy Award nomination for Best Supporting Actor for his portrayal of King Louis XVI in Marie Antoinette.

In Movie Encyclopedia, film critic Leonard Maltin describes Morley as "recognisable by his ungainly bulk, bushy eyebrows, thick lips and double chin, ... particularly effective when cast as a pompous windbag." Ephraim Katz in his International Film Encyclopaedia describes Morley as "a rotund, triple-chinned, delightful character player of the British and American stage and screen." In his autobiography, Responsible Gentleman, Morley said his stage career started with managements valuing his appearance for playing "substantial gentleman" roles – as a doctor, lawyer, accountant or other professional member of society.

== Early life ==
Morley was born in Semley, Wiltshire, England, the son of Gertrude Emily (née Fass) and Robert Wilton Morley, a major in the British Army. His mother came from a German family that had emigrated to South Africa. Morley attended Wellington College, Berkshire, which he hated, followed by the Royal Academy of Dramatic Art. As he was a famous "Old Wellingtonian", generations of headmasters tried to contact him, without success, with Morley stating "the only reason for me visiting Wellington would be to burn it down".

== Career ==
Morley made his West End stage debut in 1929 in Treasure Island at the Strand Theatre and his Broadway debut in 1938 in the title role of Oscar Wilde at the Fulton Theatre. Although soon won over to the big screen, Morley remained both a busy West End star and successful author, as well as appearing in touring productions.

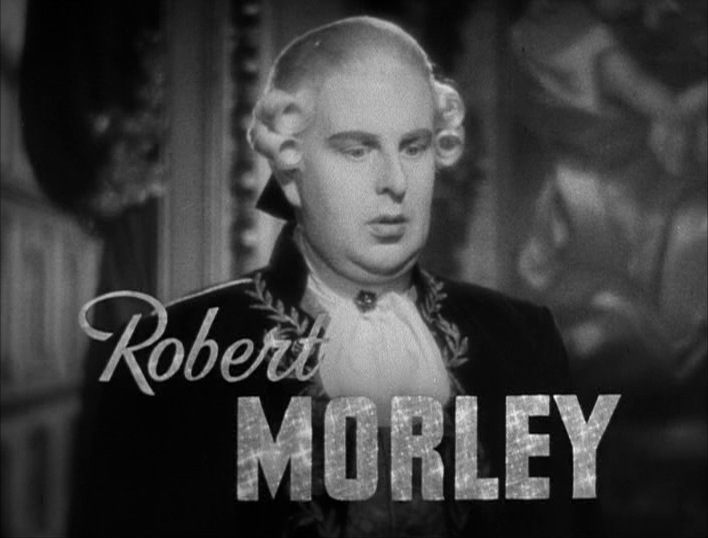
Still from the trailer for Marie Antoinette (1938)

A versatile actor, especially in his younger years, he played Louis XVI in Marie Antoinette (1938), for which he received an Academy Award nomination as Best Supporting Actor, and won both a National Board of Review Award and a Photoplay Award.

He co-wrote several plays for the stage. His 1937 play Goodness, How Sad was turned into an Ealing Studios film, Return to Yesterday (1940), directed by Robert Stevenson. Later, he had outstanding success in London and New York with Edward, My Son, a gripping family drama written in 1947 in collaboration with Noel Langley. Morley played the central role of Arnold Holt. Edward, My Son (1949) was made into a movie starring Spencer Tracy and directed by George Cukor for MGM-British. Morley's acting career continued with roles as a missionary in The African Queen (1951), The Story of Gilbert and Sullivan (1953), as W. S. Gilbert, and in Oscar Wilde (1960). In 1959 he appeared in an Alfred Hitchcock Presents adaptation of a Stanley Ellin short story entitled, 'Specialty of the House'. In Ken Annakin's Those Magnificent Men in Their Flying Machines, Morley is featured among an international ensemble cast including Stuart Whitman, Sarah Miles, Terry-Thomas, James Fox, Red Skelton, Benny Hill, Jean-Pierre Cassel, Gert Fröbe and Alberto Sordi.

Morley also personified the conservative Englishman in many comedy and caper films. He was the face of BOAC (later British Airways) as the merry television commercial spokesman of the 1970s with "We'll take good care of you". Later in his career, he received critical acclaim and acting plaudits for his performance in the 1977 comedic satire Who Is Killing the Great Chefs of Europe?, winning both a National Society of Film Critics Award and a Los Angeles Film Critics Association Award, as well as earning a nomination for a Golden Globe Award. In 1980, Morley hosted and provided explanatory introductions to the 14-episode Granada Television anthology series Ladykillers.

During the 1980s, Morley hosted Celebrity Chefs, a cooking show featuring guest celebrities, on Cable television.

He was described as a raconteur and conversationalist, and also a gourmet, which was reflected in both his real life and some of his film and TV roles.

In January 1957, Morley went into partnership with Robin Fox in a new production company called the Robin Fox Partnership Ltd, with its offices at 24, Old Burlington Street. Morley was honoured by being the first King of Moomba appointed by the Melbourne Moomba festival committee and, in typical humility, he accepted the crown in bare feet. Morley was in Australia touring his one-man show, The Sound of Morley.

In his book British Film Character Actors, Terence Pettigrew wrote: "Morley, who has more wobbly chins than a Shanghai drinking club, enjoys poking fun at life's absurdities, among whom he generously includes himself."

He was the subject of This Is Your Life in 1974 when he was surprised by Eamonn Andrews.

== Personal life and honours ==
Robert Morley married Joan Buckmaster (1910–2005), a daughter of Dame Gladys Cooper. Their elder son, Sheridan Morley, became a writer and critic. They also had a daughter, Annabel, and another son, Wilton.

He was godfather to the eldest son of fellow actor Tom Chatto.

Morley was appointed a Commander of the Order of the British Empire (CBE) in 1957 and was also offered a knighthood in 1975 but declined.

Morley was a member of the Labour Party and lived for decades in Wargrave, Berkshire.

== Death ==
Morley died from a stroke in Reading, England, on 3 June 1992 at the age of 84.

== Theatre career ==
- First stage appearance in Dr Syn (Hippodrome, Margate, 28 May 1928)
- First London role, a pirate in Treasure Island (Strand Theatre, Christmas 1929)
- Touring, plus Playhouse Oxford and Festival Cambridge repertory, (1931–33)
- Oakes in Up in the Air (Royalty Theatre, London 1933)
- Touring with Sir Frank Benson (1934–35)
- Ran a repertory company with Peter Bull (Perranporth, Cornwall, 1935)
- Title role in Oscar Wilde (Gate Theatre Studio, Villiers Street, London, 1936)
- Alexandre Dumas in The Great Romancer (Strand Theatre and New Theatre, 1937)
- Henry Higgins in Pygmalion (Old Vic Theatre, 1937)
- Title role in Oscar Wilde (Fulton Theatre, New York, October 1938)
- Title role in Springtime for Henry (Perranporth, 1939)
- Descius Heiss in Play with Fire (try-out version of The Shop at Sly Corner, Theatre Royal, Brighton, 1941)
- Sheridan Whiteside in The Man Who Came to Dinner (Savoy Theatre — and on tour – 1941–43)
- Charles in Staff Dance (also wrote, touring UK, 1944)
- Prince Regent in The First Gentleman (New Theatre and Savoy, 1945–46)
- Arnold Holt in Edward, My Son (also co-wrote, His Majesty's Theatre, 1947; also played this role at the Martin Beck Theatre New York 1948, and in Australia and New Zealand, 1949–50)
- Philip in The Little Hut (Lyric Theatre, 1950)
- Hippo in Hippo Dancing (also adapted, Lyric, 1954)
- Oswald Petersham in A Likely Tale (Globe Theatre, 1956)
- Panisse in the musical Fanny (Theatre Royal Drury Lane, 1956)
- The Tunnel of Love (directed, Her Majesty's, 1957)
- Sebastian Le Boeuf in Hook, Line and Sinker (also adapted, Piccadilly Theatre, 1958)
- Once More, with Feeling (directed, New Theatre, 1959)
- Mr Asano in A Majority of One (Phoenix Theatre, 1960)
- Title role in Mr Rhodes (Theatre Royal Windsor, 1961)
- The Bishop in A Time to Laugh (Piccadilly, 1962)
- The Sound of Morley (One-man show, touring Australia 1966–67)
- Sir Mallalieu Fitzbuttress in Halfway Up the Tree (Queen's Theatre, 1967)
- Frank Foster in How the Other Half Loves (Lyric, 1970; also North America, 1972, and Australia, 1973)
- Barnstable in A Ghost on Tiptoe (also co-wrote, Savoy, 1974)
- Pound in Banana Ridge (Savoy, 1976)
- Toured Robert Morley Talks to Everyone (1978)
- Picture of Innocence (co-wrote and toured UK and Canada, 1978)
- Hilary in The Old Country (Theatre Royal, Sydney, 1980)

== Complete filmography ==
Year	Title	Role	Notes
1935	Scrooge	Rich Man	Uncredited
1938	Marie Antoinette	King Louis XVI	
1941	You Will Remember	Tom Barrett/Leslie Stuart	
1941	Major Barbara	Andrew Undershaft	
1942	The Big Blockade	Von Geiselbrecht	
1942	This Was Paris	Van Der Stuyl	
1942	Partners in Crime	Judge	Short, Uncredited
1942	The Foreman Went to France	Mayor Coutare of Bivary	
1942	The Young Mr. Pitt	Charles James Fox	
1945	I Live in Grosvenor Square	Duke of Exmoor	
1947	The Ghosts of Berkeley Square	General "Jumbo" Burlap	
1949	The Small Back Room	The Minister	Uncredited
1949	Edward, My Son	Cameo	Uncredited
1951	Outcast of the Islands	Elmer Almayer	
1951	The African Queen	Reverend Samuel Sayer	
1952	Curtain Up	Harry Derwent Blacker	
1953	The Story of Gilbert and Sullivan	W.S. Gilbert	
1953	Melba	Oscar Hammerstein I	
1953	The Final Test	Alexander Whitehead	
1953	Beat the Devil	Peterson	
1954	The Good Die Young	Sir Francis Ravenscourt	
1954	The Rainbow Jacket	Lord Logan	
1954	Beau Brummell	King George III	
1955	The Adventures of Quentin Durward	King Louis XI	
1956	Loser Takes All	Dreuther	
1956	Around the World in 80 Days	Gauthier Ralph	
1958	Law and Disorder	Judge Crichton	
1958	The Sheriff of Fractured Jaw	Uncle Lucius	
1959	The Doctor's Dilemma	Sir Ralph Bloomfield-Bonington	
1959	The Journey	Hugh Deverill	
1959	Libel	Sir Wilfred	
1959	The Battle of the Sexes	Robert MacPherson	
1960	Oscar Wilde	Oscar Wilde	
1961	The Story of Joseph and His Brethren	Potiphar	
1961	The Young Ones	Hamilton Black	
1962	Go to Blazes	Arson Eddie	
1962	The Road to Hong Kong	Leader of the 3rd Echelon	
1962	The Boys	Montgomery	
1963	Nine Hours to Rama	P.K. Mussadi	
1963	Murder at the Gallop	Hector Enderby	
1963	The Old Dark House	Roderick Femm	
1963	Take Her, She's Mine	Mr. Pope-Jones	
1963	Ladies Who Do	Colonel Whitforth	
1964	Hot Enough for June	Colonel Cuncliffe	
1964	Of Human Bondage	Dr. Jacobs	
1964	Topkapi	Cedric Page	
1965	Genghis Khan	Emperor of China	
1965	Those Magnificent Men in Their Flying Machines	Lord Rawnsley	
1965	A Study in Terror	Mycroft Holmes	
1965	The Loved One	Sir Ambrose Ambercrombie	
1965	Life at the Top	Tiffield	
1965	The Dot and the Line: A Romance in Lower Mathematics	Narrator	Animated short
1965	The Alphabet Murders	Captain Arthur Hastings	
1966	Tender Scoundrel	Lord Swift	
1966	Hotel Paradiso	Henri Cotte	
1966	Way...Way Out	Harold Quonset	
1966	Finders Keepers	Colonel Roberts	
1966	The Trygon Factor	Hubert Hamlyn	
1967	Woman Times Seven	Dr. Xavier	Segment: "Super Simon"
1968	Hot Millions	Caesar Smith	
1969	Some Girls Do	Miss Mary	
1969	Sinful Davey	Duke of Argyll	
1969	Twinky	Judge Roxborough	
1970	Doctor in Trouble	Captain George Spratt	
1970	Cromwell	The Earl of Manchester	
1970	Song of Norway	Berg	
1971	When Eight Bells Toll	Sir Arthur Arnford-Jones (Uncle Arthur)	
1973	Theatre of Blood	Meredith Merridew	
1975	Hugo the Hippo	The Sultan	
1976	The Blue Bird	Father Time	
1978	Who Is Killing the Great Chefs of Europe?	Max Vandeveer	
1979	The Human Factor	Dr. Pecival	
1979	Scavenger Hunt	Charles Bernstein	
1980	Oh! Heavenly Dog	Bernie	
1981	Loophole	Godfrey	
1981	The Great Muppet Caper	British Gentleman	
1983	High Road to China	Bentik	
1984	Second Time Lucky	God	
1986	The Wind	Elias Appleby	
1987	The Trouble with Spies	Angus	
1987	Little Dorrit	Lord Decimus Barnacle	

== Television ==
Year	Title	Role	Notes
1959	Alfred Hitchcock Presents	Mr. Laffler	Episode: "Specialty of the House"
1966	Emergency Ward 10	James Turnbull	4 episodes
1974	Great Expectations	Uncle Pumblechook	TV movie
1980	Tales of the Unexpected	Henry Knox	Episode: "The Party"
1980-1981	Ladykillers	Himself (presenter)	TV series
1982	The Deadly Game	Emile Carpeau	TV movie
1985	Alice in Wonderland	King of Hearts	TV movie
1988-1989	War and Remembrance	Alistair Tudsbury	5 episodes
1989	The Lady and the Highwayman	Lord Chancellor	TV movie
1989	Around the World in 80 Days	Wentworth	Miniseries

== Publications ==
- A Musing Morley: The Selected Writings of Robert Morley. Robson Books. 1974. ISBN 978-0-3401-9997-8.
- Morley, Robert (1976). Morley Marvels: Memoirs, Notes, and Essays of the Famed Actor, Raconteur, Collector, Hotel Guest, and Man of Leisure. Robson Books. ISBN 978-0-9038-9581-1.
- More Morley (1978, ISBN 0 340 24763 0)
- Robert Morley's Book of Bricks (1978, ISBN 0 330 25881 8)
- Worry! (with Margaret Morley, 1979, ISBN 0 399 12596 5)
- Robert Morley's Book of Worries (U.K. of Worry!) (with Margaret Morley, 1979, ISBN 0 297 77698 3)
- Robert Morley's Second Book of Bricks (1981, ISBN 0 340 28443 9)
- The Pleasures of Age (Hodder and Stoughton) (1988 ISBN 0 340 50606 7) (re-published in a 'Coronet' imprint 1989)
- "Around The World in 81 Years"(Hodder and Stoughton) 1990, ISBN 0-340-53483 4
