= Gladys Cooper =

British actress (1888–1971)

Dame Gladys Cooper DBE
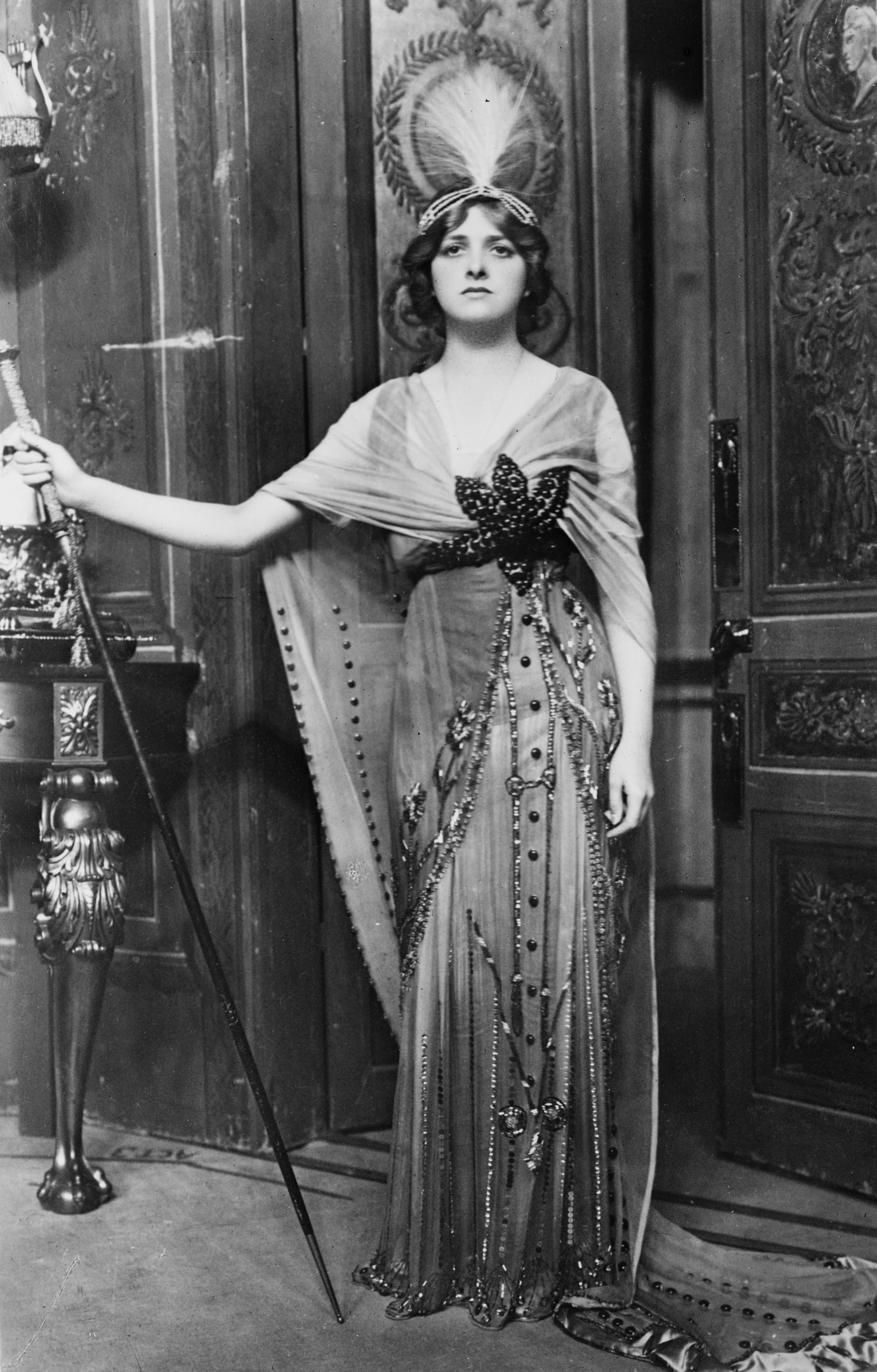
- Cooper in 1913
- Born: Gladys Constance Cooper; 18 December 1888; Hither Green, London, England
- Died: 17 November 1971 (aged 82); Henley-on-Thames, Oxfordshire, England
- Occupation: Actress
- Years active: 1905–1971
- Spouses: Capt. Herbert John Buckmaster (m. 1908; div. 1921) Sir Neville Pearson, 2nd Baronet (m. 1927; div. 1936) Philip Merivale (m. 1937; died 1946)
- Children: 3, incl. John R. Buckmaster

Dame Gladys Constance Cooper (18 December 1888 – 17 November 1971) was an English actress, theatrical manager and producer, whose career spanned seven decades on stage, in films and on television.

Beginning as a teenager in Edwardian musical comedy and pantomime, she starred in dramatic roles and silent films before the First World War. She managed the Playhouse Theatre from 1917 to 1934, where she starred in many roles. From the early 1920s Cooper won praise in plays by W. Somerset Maugham and others.

In the 1930s she starred steadily in productions both in London's West End and on Broadway. Moving to Hollywood in 1940, Cooper found success in a variety of character roles. She received three Academy Award nominations for Best Supporting Actress, for performances in The Song of Bernadette (1943), My Fair Lady (1964) and, most famously, Now, Voyager (1942). Throughout the 1950s and 1960s she worked both on stage and on screen, continuing to star on stage until her last year.

== Early life and career ==
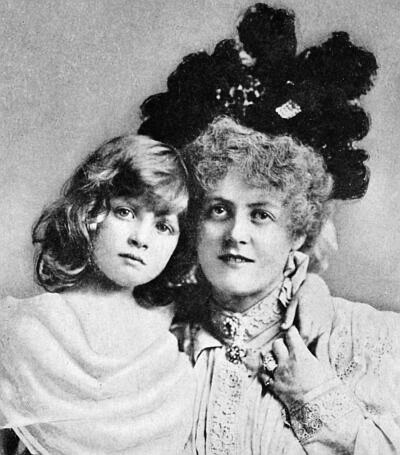
Cooper (l.) and Marie Studholme, c. 1894

Cooper was born at 23 Ennersdale Road, Hither Green, Lewisham, London, the eldest of the three daughters of Charles William Frederick Cooper (1844–1939) and Mabel (Barnett) Cooper (1861–1944). Her two younger sisters were Doris Mabel (1891–1987) and Grace Muriel (1893–1982). Writer Henry St. John Cooper was a half-brother. Cooper spent most of her childhood in Chiswick, where her family moved when she was an infant.

She made her stage debut in 1905 touring with Seymour Hicks in his musical Bluebell in Fairyland and was becoming a popular photographic model. In 1906, she appeared as Lady Swan in London in The Belle of Mayfair and then in the pantomime Babes in the Wood as Mavis. The following year she became a chorus girl at the Gaiety Theatre, creating the small role of Eva in The Girls of Gottenberg. That Christmas, she was again in Babes in the Wood, this time playing Molly. In 1908, she appeared in the musical Havana followed, the next year, by Our Miss Gibbs, in which she played Lady Connie; she was then on tour again with Hicks, in Papa's Wife, before playing Sadie von Tromp in the operetta The Dollar Princess at Daly's Theatre in 1909. In 1911, she appeared in a production of The Importance of Being Earnest and in Man and Superman. Among several other plays, the next year she was Muriel Pym in Milestones at the Royalty Theatre. A highlight of 1913 was Dora in Diplomacy at Wyndham's Theatre. That year she also played the title role in The Pursuit of Pamela at the Royalty.

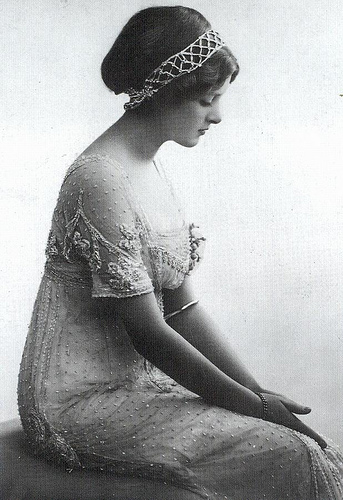
Cooper circa 1910s

In 1913 Cooper appeared in her first film, The Eleventh Commandment, going on to make several more silent films during the First World War and shortly afterwards. She continued full-time stage work, however, including appearances as Lady Agatha Lazenby in The Admirable Crichton in 1916 and Clara de Foenix in Trelawny of the Wells. In addition, in 1917, Cooper became co-manager, with Frank Curzon, of the Playhouse Theatre, taking over sole control from 1927 until she left in 1933. During these years, she starred several times in My Lady's Dress. She appeared in W. Somerset Maugham's Home and Beauty in 1919, repeated Dora at His Majesty's Theatre in 1920 and elsewhere thereafter, and both produced and played numerous roles at the Playhouse Theatre. In 1921 she created the role of Miralda Clement in Lord Dunsany's play If at the Ambassadors Theatre.

It was not until 1922, however, then in her mid-thirties, that she found major critical success, in Arthur Wing Pinero's The Second Mrs. Tanqueray. Early in her stage career, she was criticised for being too stiff. Aldous Huxley dismissed her performance in Home and Beauty, writing "she is too impassive, too statuesque, playing all the time as if she were Galatea, newly unpetrified and still unused to the ways of the living world." Evidently, her acting improved during this period, as Maugham praised her for "turning herself from an indifferent actress to an extremely competent one" through her common sense and industriousness. For both the 1923 and 1924 Christmas shows at the Adelphi Theatre, Cooper played the title character in Peter Pan, while also playing several other roles at that theatre during those two years. She appeared in Maugham's The Letter in London and on tour in 1927 and 1928, in Excelsior (adapted from "L'Ecole des Cocottes" by H.M. Harwood) in 1928, and in Maugham's The Sacred Flame in 1929, also in London and on tour.

Among other roles, Cooper was Clemency Warlock in Cynara (1930), Wanda Heriot in The Pelican (1931), Lucy Haydon in Dr Pygmalion (1932), Carola in The Firebird (1932), Jane Claydon in The Rats of Norway (1933), Mariella Linden in The Shining Hour in 1934 and 1935, in London and New York City and on tour (at the same time making her first "talkie" film, The Iron Duke), also playing Desdemona and Lady Macbeth on Broadway in 1935. She was Dorothy Hilton in Call it a Day, again in both London and New York, from 1935 to 1936. A highlight of 1937 was Laura Lorimer in Goodbye to Yesterday in London and on tour. In 1938, she played Tiny Fox-Collier in Spring Meeting in New York, Montreal and Britain, as well as several Shakespeare roles and Fran Dodsworth in Dodsworth. She repeated Spring Meeting in 1939.

== Later career ==
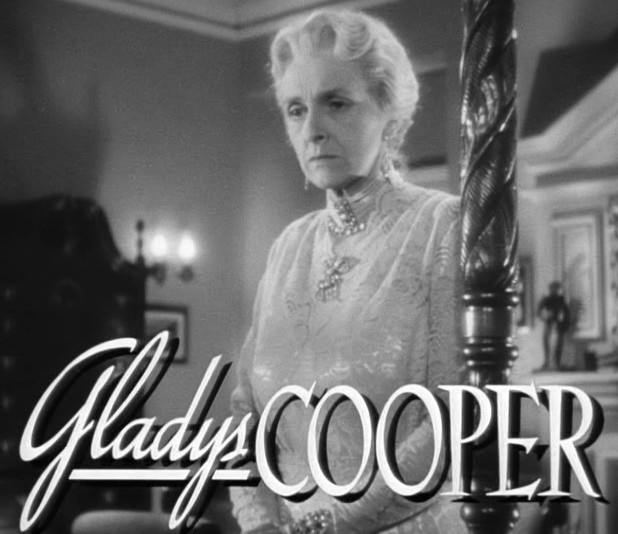
Cooper in Now, Voyager (1942)

Cooper turned to film full-time in 1940, finding success in Hollywood in a variety of character roles and was frequently cast as a disapproving, aristocratic society woman, although she sometimes played lively, approachable types, as she did in Rebecca (1940). She was nominated three times for an Academy Award for Best Supporting Actress for her performances as Bette Davis's domineering mother in Now, Voyager (1942), a sceptical nun in The Song of Bernadette (1943), and Rex Harrison's mother, Mrs. Higgins, in My Fair Lady (1964). In 1945, after playing the role of Clarissa Scott in the film The Valley of Decision, for Metro-Goldwyn-Mayer she was given a contract with the studio. Her credits there included both dramatic and comedy films, including The Green Years (1946), The Cockeyed Miracle (1946) and The Secret Garden (1949). Other notable film roles were The Man Who Loved Redheads (1955), Separate Tables (1958) and The Happiest Millionaire (1967) as Aunt Mary Drexel, singing "There Are Those".

Her only stage roles in the 1940s were Mrs. Parrilow in The Morning Star in Philadelphia and New York (1942) and Melanie Aspen in The Indifferent Shepherd in Britain (1948). She returned to theatre (between films) more often in the 1950s and 1960s, playing in London and on tour in such roles as Edith Fenton in The Hat Trick (1950); Felicity, Countess of Marshwood, in Relative Values (1951 and 1953); Grace Smith in A Question of Fact (1953); Lady Yarmouth in The Night of the Ball (1954); Mrs. St. Maugham in The Chalk Garden (1955–56), Dame Mildred in The Bright One (1958); Mrs. Vincent in Look on Tempests (1960); Mrs. Gantry (Bobby) in The Bird of Time (1961); Mrs. Moore in a stage adaptation of A Passage to India (1962); Mrs Tabret in The Sacred Flame (1966 and 1967); Prue Salter in Let's All Go Down the Strand (1967); Emma Littlewood in Out of the Question (1968); Lydia in His, Hers and Theirs (1969); and others. She received two nominations for the Tony Award for Best Actress in a Play, for her roles in The Chalk Garden and A Passage to India.

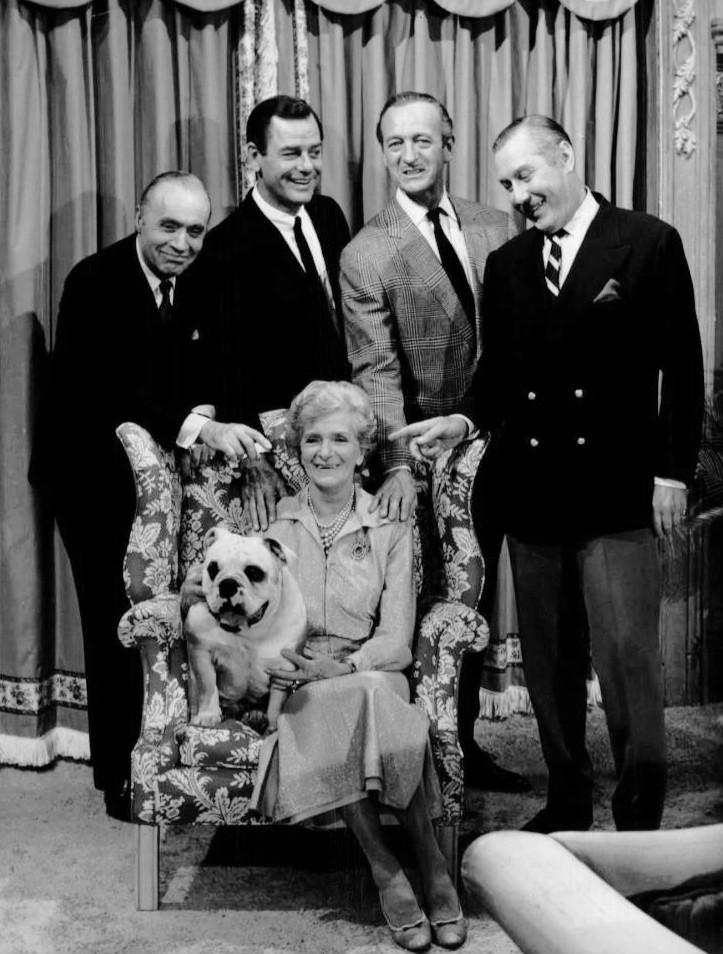
The cast of The Rogues (1964): Charles Boyer, Gig Young, David Niven, Robert Coote and Cooper

She also had various television roles in the 1950s and '60s. These included, among others, three episodes of The Twilight Zone: "Nothing in the Dark" (1962), "Passage on the Lady Anne" (1963) and "Night Call" (1964). Cooper starred in the 1964–65 series The Rogues with David Niven, Charles Boyer, Gig Young, Robert Coote, John Williams and Larry Hagman. The series lasted a single season of thirty episodes, most of which featured Cooper as the matriarch of an ethical family of con artists who only prey on criminals.

In 1967, at the age of 79, she was appointed a Dame Commander of the Order of the British Empire (DBE). Her last major success on the stage was at age 82, in 1970–71 in the role of Mrs. St. Maugham in Enid Bagnold's The Chalk Garden, a role she had created on Broadway and in the West End in 1955–56.

Her final public appearance was on the 5 May 1971 episode of The Dick Cavett Show, on which she guested with her son-in-law Robert Morley in London. On the day following Cooper's death, her Now, Voyager co-star Bette Davis appeared on The Dick Cavett Show and called Cooper "Without a doubt, the most beautiful person as well as actress, and a professional ... never was she late one minute, never didn't she know every line."

== Personal life and death ==
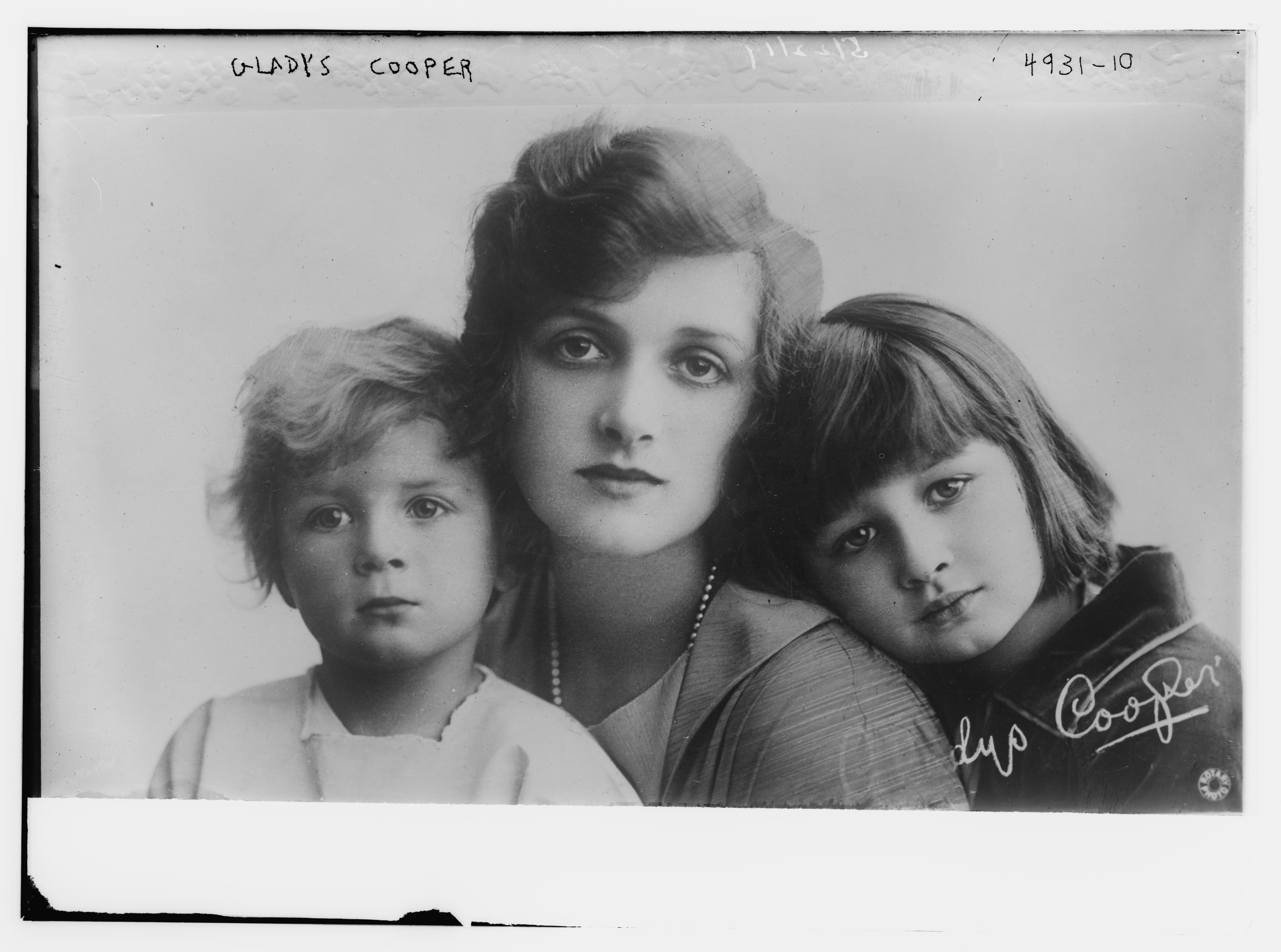
Cooper with her children, John and Joan

Cooper was married three times.

- Captain Herbert Buckmaster (1908–1921). The couple had two children: Joan (1910–2005), who married the actor Robert Morley, and John R. Buckmaster (1915–1983).
- Sir Neville Pearson (1927–1936). Sir Neville and Lady Pearson had one daughter, Sally Pearson, aka Sally Cooper, who was married to the actor Robert Hardy from 1961 to 1986.
- Philip Merivale (1937–1946), a fellow actor. The couple lived for many years in Santa Monica, California as permanent resident aliens. He died at age 59 from a heart ailment. Her stepson from this marriage was John Merivale.

Cooper published a self-titled autobiography in 1931. Her portrait with Sally as a child was painted by Minnie Walters Anson and is in the Russell-Cotes Art Gallery and Museum, Bournemouth. She lived mostly in England in her final years and died from pneumonia in 1971 at the age of 82 in Henley-on-Thames, Oxfordshire.

== Filmography ==
Year	Title	Role	Note
1913	The Eleventh Commandment	Edith	Short
1914	Danny Donovan, the Gentleman Cracksman	Mrs. Ashworth	Short
1916	The Real Thing at Last	American Witch	Short
1917	The Sorrows of Satan	Lady Sybil Elton	
1917	Masks and Faces	Mabel Vane	
1917	My Lady's Dress	The Wife	
1920	Unmarried		
1921	Headin' North	Madge Mullin	
1922	The Bohemian Girl	Arlene Arnheim	
1923	Bonnie Prince Charlie	Flora MacDonald	Lost film
1934	The Iron Duke	Duchess d'Angoulême	
1940	Rebecca	Beatrice Lacy	Maxim's sister
1940	Kitty Foyle	Mrs. Strafford	
1941	That Hamilton Woman	Frances, Lady Nelson	
1941	The Black Cat	Myrna Hartley	
1941	A Yank in the R.A.F.	Mrs. Pillby	(scenes deleted)
1941	The Gay Falcon	Maxine Wood	
1942	This Above All	Iris Cathaway	
1942	Eagle Squadron	Aunt Emmeline	
1942	Now, Voyager	Mrs. Henry Vale	Nominated: Academy Award for Best Supporting Actress
1943	Forever and a Day	Mrs. Barringer	
1943	Mr. Lucky	Captain Veronica Steadman	
1943	Princess O'Rourke	Miss Haskell	
1943	The Song of Bernadette	Sister Marie Therese Vauzou	Nominated: Academy Award for Best Supporting Actress
1944	The White Cliffs of Dover	Lady Jean Ashwood	
1944	Mrs. Parkington	Alice, Duchess de Brancourt	
1945	The Valley of Decision	Clarissa Scott	
1945	Love Letters	Beatrice Remington	
1946	The Green Years	Grandma Leckie	
1946	Beware of Pity	Mrs. Klara Condor	
1946	The Cockeyed Miracle	Amy Griggs	
1947	Green Dolphin Street	Sophie Patourel	
1947	The Bishop's Wife	Mrs. Hamilton	
1948	Homecoming	Mrs. Kirby	
1948	The Pirate	Aunt Inez	
1949	The Secret Garden	Mrs. Medlock	
1949	Madame Bovary	Madame Dupuis	
1951	Thunder on the Hill	Mother Superior	
1952	At Sword's Point	Queen Anne	
1955	The Man Who Loved Redheads	Caroline, Lady Binfield	
1957	Alfred Hitchcock Presents	Mrs. Margarite Gillespie	Season 2 Episode 22: "The End of Indian Summer"
1958	Separate Tables	Mrs. Railton-Bell	
1962	The Twilight Zone	Wanda Dunn	1 episode: "Nothing in the Dark"
1963	The List of Adrian Messenger	Mrs. Karoudjian	
1963	Going My Way	Mrs. Arnold Sedgewick	1 episode
1963	The Twilight Zone	Millie McKenzie	1 episode: "Passage on the Lady Anne"
1963	Pygmalion	Mrs. Higgins	TV movie
1963	Burke's Law	Harriet Richards	1 episode
1963	The Outer Limits	Mrs. Palmer	1 episode: "The Borderland"
1963	The Alfred Hitchcock Hour	Mrs. Raydon	Season 1 Episode 16: "What Really Happened"
1964	My Fair Lady	Mrs. Higgins	Nominated: Academy Award for Best Supporting Actress
1964	The Alfred Hitchcock Hour	Laura	Season 3 Episode 11: "Consider Her Ways"
1964	The Twilight Zone	Elva Keene	1 episode: "Night Call"
1964	The Rogues	Margaret St. Clair	25 episodes; nominated: Primetime Emmy Awards for Outstanding Individual Achievements in Entertainment – Actors and Performers
1965	Emergency – Ward 10	Sister McInnes	4 episodes
1965	Ben Casey	Dr. Hagar Brandt	1 episode
1966	The Girl from U.N.C.L.E	Mama Rosh	1 episode: "The Romany Lie Affair"
1967	The Happiest Millionaire	Aunt Mary	
1967	Adam Adamant Lives!	Grand Duchess Vorokhov	1 episode: "Black Echo"
1967	Callan	Dr. Schultz	1 episode: "Goodness Burns Too Bright"
1969	A Nice Girl Like Me	Aunt Mary	
1970	The Great Inimitable Mr. Dickens	Mrs. Ternan	TV movie
1971	The Doctors	Harriet Vey	8 episodes
1972	The Persuaders!	Grand Duchess Ozerov	1 episode: "The Ozerov Inheritance" (final appearance)
