= Norman Marshall (theatre director) =

British theatre director (1901 - 1980)

Norman Marshall (16 November 1901 – 7 November 1980) was an English theatrical director, producer and manager who began his theatrical career while still an undergraduate student at Oxford. After leaving university he worked with various small touring companies and in 1926 he joined Terence Gray at the Cambridge Festival Theatre, first as a press agent, then as a stage manager, and in 1932 he became their resident director. In 1934, he bought the lease on the small London club theatre, the Gate Theatre Studio, where in the next six years he produced popular intimate revues and many successful plays, some of which later transferred to the West-end stage.

In his 1947 book The Other Theatre he documented the histories of a number of small, committed, independent theatre companies including his own, the Oxford Playhouse, the Arts Theatre Club and the Cambridge Festival Theatre. These theatres were able to avoid the Lord Chamberlain’s censorship by operating as theatre clubs, where membership was obligatory, and took risks by producing new and experimental plays, or plays by writers thought to be commercially unviable on the West-end stage,

The Gate Theatre Studio was destroyed during the Blitz bombing campaign of WWII and after the war Marshall set up a production company and produced several plays in the West-end. In his book The Producer and the Play he described the history of theatrical production together with his own experiences.

== Sources ==
- Norman Marshall, The Other Theatre, John Lehmann, London, 1947.
- Norman Marshall, The Producer and the Play, Macdonald, London, 1957.
- Colin Chambers (Ed.), Continuum Companion to Twentieth Century Theatre, Continuum, London, 2002.
