= Entertainment industry during World War II =

History of the entertainment industry from 1939 to 1945

During World War II, the entertainment industry changed to help the war effort. Often the industry became more closely controlled by national governments, who believed that a supportive home front was crucial to victory. Through regulation and censorship, governments sought to keep spirits high and to depict the war in a positive light. They also found new ways to use entertainment media to keep citizens informed.

Government censorship of mass media was enforced because of fears of threats to national harmony and security. The most popular forms of entertainment were radio, film, and music. Together these aimed to keep citizens entertained, informed about the war effort, and motivated. Broadcast radio was an especially powerful communication tool.

== Radio ==
In comparison to television, radio was a much more affordable form of entertainment. Because of this, the radio was the most popular form of entertainment during World War II. Radio stations fueled propaganda and reached a countless number of citizens. Many shows popularized and quickly gained influence in certain countries. Radio broadcasts, like other forms of entertainment at the time, were regulated by the government and were pushed to keep citizens informed about war efforts and to encourage citizens to help the cause. Radio stations, along with other media outlets, were major fuels of propaganda during World War II.

An example of a popular radio program is Tommy Handley's It's That Man Again, which continued airing throughout the war in Britain until 1949. Comedian Tommy Handley utilized his radio broadcasts to keep citizens informed about the war efforts and to keep the spirits of Britain high during this time of hardship. It's That Man Again garnered substantial influence - up to 40% of the British population listened to this show during World War II. The show's last broadcast occurred on January 6, 1949, with Handley passing away only three days later. To further demonstrate the show's influence, two memorial services were held in his honor, with thousands of listeners present at the funeral grounds.

It's That Man Again was hosted on BBC, a broadcasting service program still widely known in Britain today. Like BBC, other broadcasting companies also attempted to keep civilian spirits high and expressed certain opinions on the war. Hosts of radio programs took sides regarding the war; for example, the Voice of Russia, the government's international radio broadcasting station, expressed the country's opinions and eventually targeted the United States. Radio programs were broadcast in up to twenty-three different languages, which widened the appeal of these stations.

== Film ==
The film industry during World War II was an important source of communication to the people on all sides. At this time the cinema was the most popular form of entertainment to the people. It was used to entertain, lift spirits, motivate and inform the audience. This made film an important means of distributing propaganda. Governments used film to influence the public to support the war effort in their everyday lives and to justify their actions. Film was a powerful force which unified the nations. Cinemas provided for a good place to watch information films. New films that showed in cinemas were often informative of a country's war efforts or the progress of the war itself. Furthermore, the government released additional films that were designed to model the desired human behaviors and actions during the war. These government films often suggested methods of coping with the loss of families and homes and to inform the audience to caution the presence of enemy spies.

Though Television had first been publicly demonstrated in London in 1926, only few people owned television sets because of its price and scarcity. Since most citizens did not own televisions, they relied on cinemas to keep informed and educated. Cinemas of Europe and the United States were mostly regulated by the government. Films made during this time period were more realistic than escapist, in contrast to entertainment during the Great Depression.

=== Hollywood (United States) ===
The USA entered the Second World War in December 1941 and the entertainment industry was used to shape opinion and foster support. The main focus that the US wanted to make on films was their own historical phenomena and a spread of US culture. The war films made focused mostly on the "desperate affirmation" and the "societal tensions". Many films main focus was about the war; they wanted to make sure that they explain the objectives. The US war films were good and bad, many of them showed the different lives of the people during the war. The importance of these films and as studies have mentioned, is the influence behind these films. Furthermore, war films showed a lot of information about the war and the life of their families just like the film Since You Went Away. When the US government noticed the content of the feature films they became more interested in the political and social significance messages in the film. This shows how Hollywood wanted to raise two important production of films together with war films. With the growth of the film industry came the growth of the influence of Hollywood celebrities. Hollywood stars appeared in advertisements and toured the country to encourage citizens to purchase war bonds to support their country in the war.

==== Propaganda ====
The influence of the film industry during the Second World War made it the ideal tool for both explicit and implicit propaganda. Hollywood was controlled by the government through the United States Office of War Information (OWI). In June 1942 they formed The Bureau of Motion Picture as the Hollywood branch of their operations. Nelson Poynter coordinated communication between these two agencies and published a comprehensive Manual for the Motion-Picture Industry. The agency worked with film makers to record and photograph wartime activities while regulating its content. This was often met with hostile reaction from the major studios and producers.

The first Hollywood film to depict Germany under Nazi rule was Hitler - Beast of Berlin. It was shot in under a week showed the brutal treatment of resisting heroes in concentration camps at the hands of vicious Gestapo officers.

In 1941, the US entered the war and more films were made to reinforce an image of the Nazis as "Army officers as impeccable aristocrats, cold, aloof and efficient, Gestapo men as clever and merciless…. And the German soldier as efficient, disciplined, and unswervingly patriotic". This was a strong image of a military regime which did not respect the individual or democracy.

Hollywood did not just focus on stereotyping Nazis but also in raising the moral of the people. Movies that depict "war" reinforced the message that the war would not be permanent and that a better world and society would be created in the end. Hence, they were aimed at keeping the moral of the nation high and convincing the people that the war justified and righteous. For example, movies like The Story of G.I. Joe, Dive Bomber, So Proudly We Hail! and Sahara all displayed the humanitarian principles of the allies in contrast to the brutality of the enemy and gave justification to the public to fight the war. Film historian Arthur F. Mclure states that these motivational films had two purposes: "to give unity of purpose for the war itself and to give strength of purpose to the people on the home front". Propaganda not only was used to create an impression of an evil Nazi enemy but also to instill in the people the justification of the war they were in and Hollywood provided this in its film production. Hollywood believed that "the role that films should play in time of war was a bone of contention within the industry" which describes the conflict between patriotism and art was ongoing throughout the war.

==== Censorship ====
The film industry cooperated with the OWI and included suggested ideas within films. The FBI remained constantly suspicious of Hollywood and kept an investigation of all activities. The agency worked to display the war in a positive light and censored negative content, pictures of American casualties were banned from being published until 1943.

The Bureau of Motion Picture (BMP) also prevented the re-release of Gunga Din due to "glorification of British Imperialism" that was thought to undermine the unity of the Allied powers.

In 2008, documents published by the National Archives leaked to the public regarding the involvement of numerous Hollywood celebrities with the Office of Strategic Services during World War II. Some 750,000 documents reveal that famous American public figures were actually spies for the Office of Strategic Services. These celebrities include director John Ford, chef Julia Child and baseball player Moe Berg, who were hired to gather information by the US military's Joint Chiefs of Staff.

=== Britain ===
The film industry in Britain during World War II was highly important to the country and had a huge impact on the citizens. Two days after Britain declared war on Germany the government ordered that all public entertainment places to close which included "4300 cinemas". Within two weeks, this was revoked and far from being afraid to go to the cinema the attendances grew steadily. "Cinemas thrived in wartime, and attendance figures surged upward from an average of just under 20 million weekly admissions in 1939 to over 30 million weekly admissions in 1944 and 1945. In a country with a population of approximately 48 million people. This is a clear indication of the part that films played in the lives of the ordinary people to either escape reality. Statistics show that the Wartime Social Survey, conducted in 1943, found that 32% of Britons went to the cinema frequently (defined as once a week or more) and another 38% attended occasionally (defined as once a fortnight or less)". Therefore, more than half of the British population were regular cinema goers. There were many reasons why the cinema was so popular. During this time everybody was employed but food was rationed and not everyone especially women wanted to spend their time in pubs. Therefore, a cinema was a secure and warm place to go to where a person could escape their own homes which often had lodgers living with them and spend their money.

==== Propaganda ====
Propaganda was also prevalent in the British film industry movies such as In Which We Serve, The First of the Few, Went the Day Well?, Pastor Hall, One of Our Aircraft Is Missing, Journey Together, The Silver Fleet and The Way Ahead were made. The film Miss Grant Goes to the Door, showed audiences how to recognize German spies, how to hide Ordnance Survey maps from enemies, and how to be of aid to soldiers and sailors – women were encouraged to knit socks and mittens for sailors. This film further reminded citizens that ‘’Cromwell’’ was the code word to signify the invasion of Britain. Some of the propaganda films made in Britain were sponsored by the government to be featured films with a message motivate the audience. Even Though television had been invented it was in its infancy and very few people had a television set. The only home entertainment for most people was a radio or a gramophone.

=== Germany ===
Films in Germany played a dominant figure in propaganda during World War II in Germany. WWII was a blow to Germans film centers. The film industry in Germany was controlled by the Nazis. The ordering of the closure of the films was given where they were reopened later under the control of Nazi. People relied on the industry to acquire news and get entertained. It is the place where people were going to get their stresses off. The films had shown promoting the nations culture where people would watch and learn what was expected of them. People did not have televisions during World War II and the only place they would get chances of watching were the film centers and entertainment joints.

The film industry was initially the source of information for the nation's citizens. The broadcast helped them understand what was happening in the world, especially with the two major operating films. On taking control, the Nazi party ensured that what they wanted to be known. This had an impact on the citizens because the content depicted was merely Nazism in cinema. Films depicted messages which provided people with information against the Jews. It tried to explain how Jews were bad people and "why they looked like rats". Spreading diseases, making the nation dirty and slowing the other nations’ economies was all that the German citizens were fed with about the Jews so that they could also hate and collaborate in fighting them. The nation's values were disrupted where people were expected to follow the iron fist and what was provided on the films rather than what rotated around their way of life and cultural practices. The film industry was filled with lies and negative information meant to destroy people's relations and give Nazi more support. Propaganda was evident in the Germany film Industry films such as Der Marsch zum Führer and Menschen im Sturm. These films showed the nationwide march of Hitler Youth to Nuremberg for the Nazi Party Rally. Also, it showed the justification of Germany's invasion of Slovenia. Fritz Kirchhoff was a director who showed anti-British propaganda in his films. Kirchhoff directed Attack on Baku (1942) which was filmed in Germany intending to show messages against the British while including patriotism.

Patriotism was evoked by the means of utilizing the German literature of the 19th century. The nation was already well-read on most of popular German writings of that period. It was the task of Nazi cinema to strategically target the population, in this case the German nation and convince them to visit theaters. The profit from the sales was ever-growing and came in handy for the means of mobilizing the nation. The profitability of the Nazi movie industry receive such a great demand that it operated all the way up until the end of the war in 1945. One of the last movies directed during 1945 was Kolberg, which gained popularity due to the fact it contained the most convincing speeches for the viewers to keep fighting to the end.

==== Popular German propaganda films ====
- Der Marsch zum Führer
- Die Rothschilds
- Der ewige Jude
- Venus vor Gericht
- Menschen im Sturm

=== Film genres ===
Between 1939 and 1942, there were 1,313 feature films produced worldwide of these 374 films had a connection with war. Of the films with a war-connection 43 films dealt with why America was fighting the war while 107 films dealt with the enemy. There are nearly two and a half times the number of film about the enemy then the justification for war. A further 68 films dealt with the allies. The remaining films are split into two groups either the 65 home-front films made which included life under war-time conditions and other occupations such as red-cross or air-raid wardens. The remaining 95 films were feature length about American soldiers fighting the war.

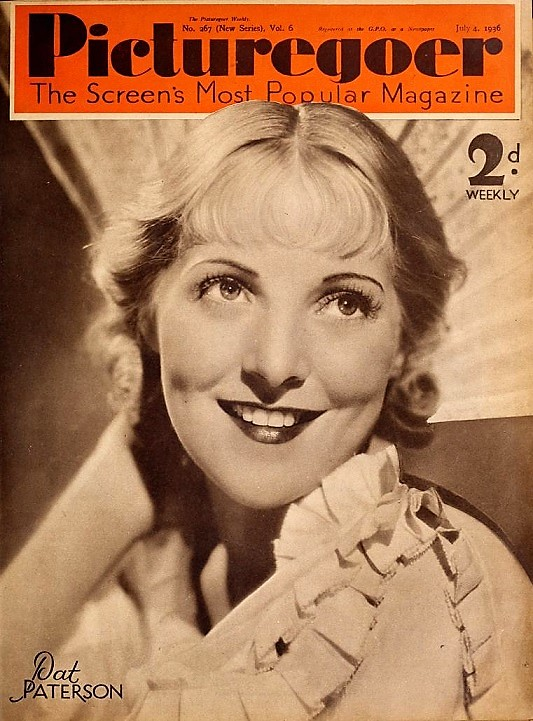
Cover page of Picturegoer

Most of the films in this period were about the enemy and had a propaganda basis. Films were created to influence the audience to believe that the enemy was evil followed by films showing the bravery of the American forces. After this came, equal categories of supporting the allies and the Homefront followed by the fewest films which covered the reason why America was fighting the war. This follows a recognized pattern for propaganda where validation of an action is the least priority and concepts are a high priority.

=== Impact of the film industry ===
During and after the war, the cinema was the most popular pastime. "The average 'A' film reached an audience of thirteen million in 1948, a large audience than could be claimed by any single magazine, book or newspaper". It was the prime form for entertainment and reached all members of society. Going to the cinema was such a special occasion because the audience were treated to the entertainment within dazzling movie palaces. These buildings equated with the power of this industry they not only showed films but they were prime source of news distribution audiences. Cinema-going was not just to see feature films but the audience also watched news articles such as Pathe News which were important for the government to inform the population. Concession sales in movie theaters were also rising during this time, as by 1945 movie theater audiences made up of half of the popcorn consumed in the United States.

Most moviegoers had family members participating in the war and were suffering hardships in their daily lives, and the cinema was an effective form of escapism from reality. This included not just the films themselves but also in related magazines such as "Picture-goer," which followed the film industry throughout this period. The magazine describes Hollywood glamour "an impossible ideal… but also one that freed women expectation of self sacrifice". Men and women tried to imitate the fashion and styles of stars in order to raise their spirits. The film industry in that era did not solely focus on propaganda but also created psychological support and motivation through its film stars.

== Music ==
The theme of war took a popular role in the development of pop music. Artists expressed their feelings of hardships during the war. Others sang songs that aimed to lift the spirits of the citizens.

British singer Vera Lynn, or the Forces Sweetheart, sang popular songs such as "We'll Meet Again" and "The White Cliffs of Dover", which restored an optimistic outlook for soldiers and families while uplifting Allied spirits during a time of hardship when Nazi Germany was bombing Britain. American singer and stage actress Adelaide Hall also entertained extensively throughout WWII entertaining both the public and the troops in the UK and with ENSA across Europe.

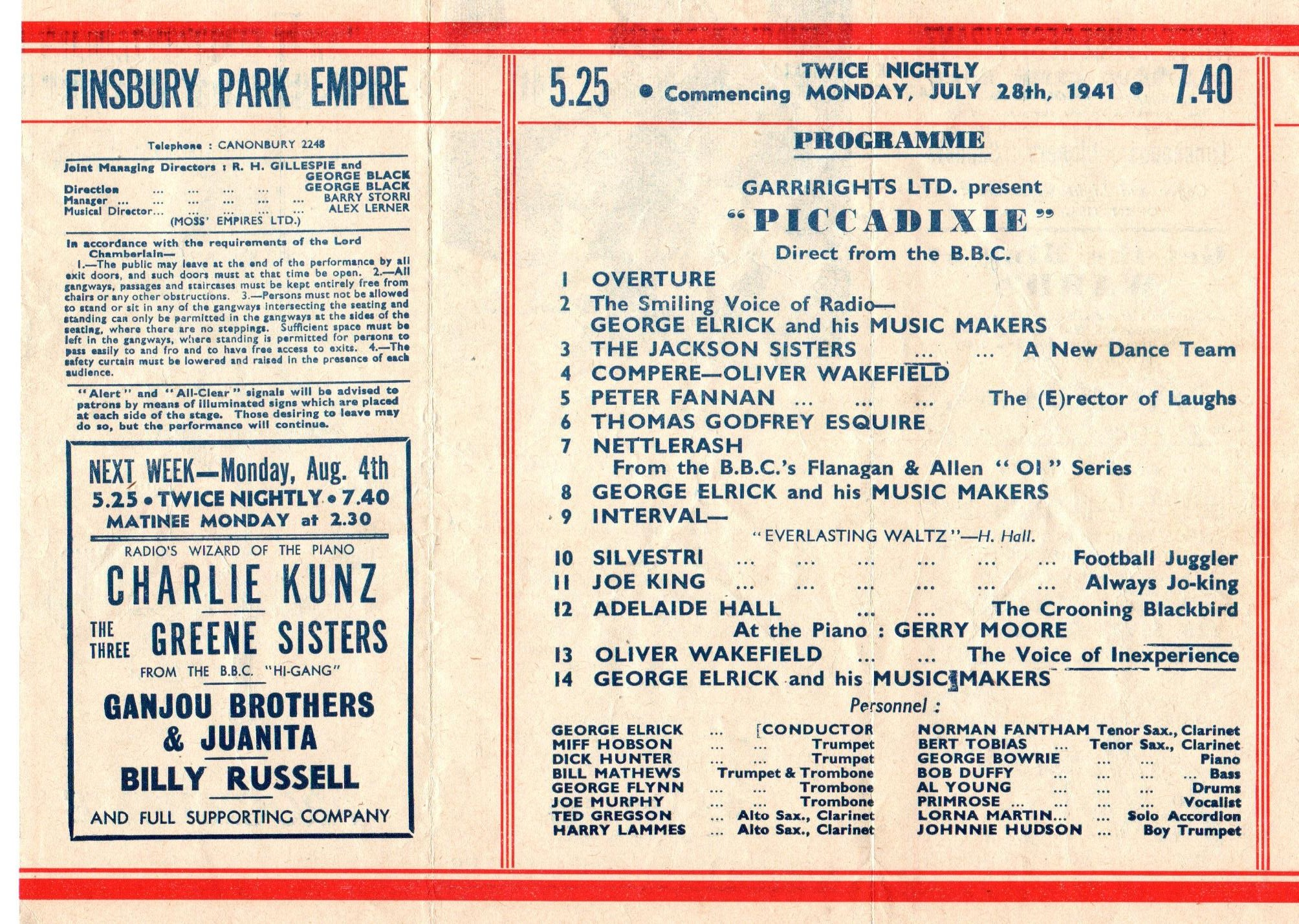
Adelaide Hall starring in Piccadixie at the Finsbury Park Empire, London, 28 July 1941

"The Last Time I Saw Paris" was a 1941 Academy Award-winning song by Jerome Kern and Oscar Hammerstein, which illustrated memories of the magnificent city of Paris that had been taken over by Germany prior to the song's release.

=== Government involvement in the music industry ===
Government agencies pushed music producers to record more patriotic and uplifting songs. The Office of War Information especially pushed for this following the bombing of Pearl Harbor in the United States. In her book God Bless America, Kathleen E.R. Smith states that only twenty-seven war-themed songs had reached the top ten charts during the span of the war.

This suggests that these patriotic war-themed songs, pushed by the government, did not sell well. Billboard archives suggest that the public preferred escapist and rather lighthearted songs. Female singers became more prominent by singing songs expressing the war from the woman's point of view, illustrating feelings of separation and loneliness. Furthermore, as musicians joined the military, larger bands shrunk and often disbanded, creating a trend towards soloists and smaller music groups.

=== Musician contributions to the war ===
Many musicians contributed to the war effort. Musician Glenn Miller enlisted in the army to perform in the United States Organization, in which he established the Army Air Force Band. Musician Irving Berlin assisted in the war effort by creating the "This is the Army" musical, which raised millions by playing on Broadway and for the US troops.

=== Impact of the war ===
Because of the war, approximately 15 million people "crossed county lines" and brought about the spread of different music styles like country music and African-American styles.

Even the war itself influenced the music industry through its technology. Germany's magnetic tape technology became a staple in music production for independent producers after it was captured by the Allies. Magnetic tape sound recording allowed for independent producers to produce high quality sounds without the assistance of major labels.

== Dance ==
The evolution of music brought about new sounds such as jazz and swing music. These sounds translated to new dances. Jitterbug dancing grew in popularity. The Jive, which was taken to England by American troops, eventually became a dance of the International style of Ballroom dance.

== See also ==
- Battle of Los Angeles
- California during World War II
