= Brian Desmond Hurst =

Belfast-born film director (1895–1986)

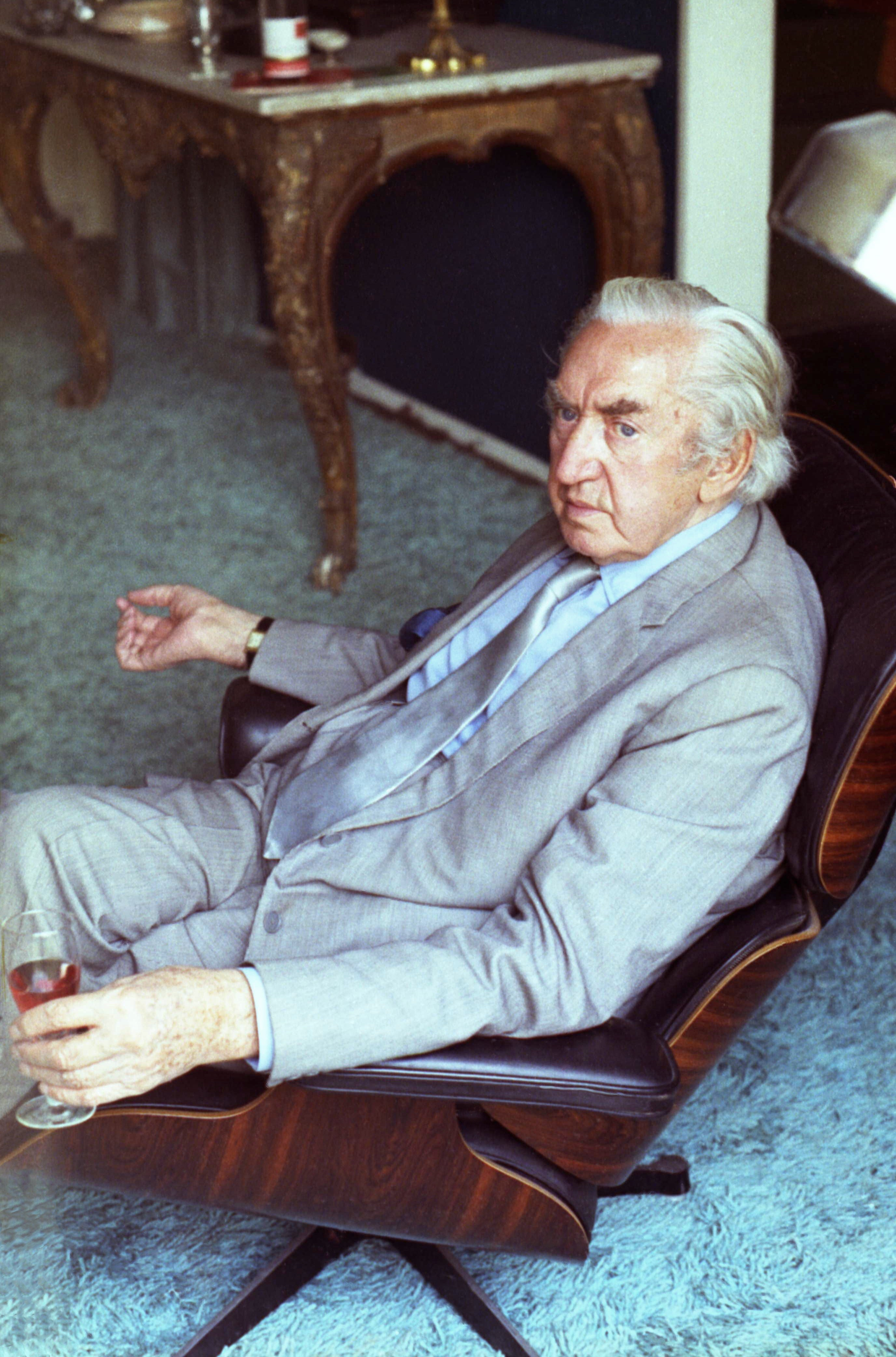
- Brian Desmond Hurst in 1976 (portrait by Allan Warren)
- Born: 12 February 1895; Belfast, Ireland
- Died: 26 September 1986 (aged 91); London, UK
- Occupation: Film director
- Notable work: Dangerous Moonlight (1941); Scrooge (1951); Malta Story (1953)

Brian Desmond Hurst (12 February 1895 – 26 September 1986) was an Irish film director. With over thirty films in his filmography, Hurst was hailed as Northern Ireland's best film director by BBC film critic Mike Catto. He is perhaps best known for the 1951 A Christmas Carol adaptation Scrooge.

== Early life ==
Hurst was born at 23 Ribble Street, Belfast, into a working-class family. He attended the New Road School, a public elementary school in East Belfast.

Hurst's father, Robert senior, and brother, Robert junior, were iron-workers in the Harland and Wolff shipyard. In August 1914, at the outbreak of World War I, Hurst enlisted as a private in the British Army. He saw service with the 6th Battalion Royal Irish Rifles at the battle of Chunuk Bair in Gallipoli, the Balkans and the Middle East. At Chunuk Bair his regiment were "battle virgins when they were thrown into the Turkish machine gun fire for the first time on 10 August 1915". "They had set out a few hours before for the Chunuk Bair with twenty officers and over 700 men. Several stragglers and those who had lost their way returned to base in the hours that lay ahead but by the evening of 10 August the Hampshires and the Rifles had been broken in what amounted to a cruel massacre".

Hurst was interviewed by Punch magazine in 1969. The article includes Hurst's statement that "I would fight for England against anybody except Ireland" and it continues: "Why for England? 'Because an Englishman is worth twenty foreigners.' Why not against Ireland? 'Because an Irishman is worth fifty Englishmen.'"

Returning from World War I Hurst found life in Belfast constraining and he took a government grant to emigrate to Canada sometime in 1920. He enrolled at the Toronto College of Art.

== Early film career ==
Under the guidance of John Ford, sometimes referred to as Hurst's cousin although the two were unrelated by blood, Hurst learned about set management. Hurst made a cameo appearance as an extra in Ford's Hangman's House (1928) where he briefly appears alongside a young John Wayne. Hurst was with Ford and helped advise him when he brought Hollywood to Ireland when making The Quiet Man (1952).

By 1933, Hurst was ready to return to the UK and settled in Belgravia, where he lived from the 1930s to his death in 1986, although he often returned to Ulster to visit relatives for "a spiritual bath".

Hurst's early Irish work is John Millington Synge's Riders to the Sea (1935) and the Irish War of Independence love story Ourselves Alone (1936). Irish Hearts (1934) "is certainly one of the main contenders for the first Irish sound feature film". Riders to the Sea was shot in Connemara where Hurst used the actors of the Abbey Theatre in Dublin and "the film reflects the disparity between the two, with the actors delivering their lines in a highly technical manner whilst the camera revels in the bleak, natural beauty of the coastline and sky. Hurst's visuals are invariably compared with those of his mentor, John Ford and the opening shots of Riders... are markedly Fordian in their elementary quality".

Ourselves Alone was banned in Northern Ireland at the time of its release in 1936 although it has now achieved the recognition it deserved and is shown in museums and other public access points in Northern Ireland. It appears to have been misunderstood. At the time Hurst pointed out the original story had been written by a British Army officer and Hurst claimed that the film was "pro-British".

Hurst's earliest English films include The Tell-Tale Heart (1934), The Tenth Man (1936) and Glamorous Night (1937). In 1937, Hurst was retained by Alexander Korda to direct a film about T. E. Lawrence and he co-wrote a screenplay for it with Miles Malleson and Duncan Guthrie, but the project was obstructed by the British administration in Palestine before Hurst, himself an Arabic-speaker, could scout locations.

On the Night of the Fire is regarded as one of the early examples of British film noir. Released in December 1939 at the outbreak of the Second World War and set in Newcastle upon Tyne, it charts the slow moral destruction of a barber following his theft of some money. Film critic David Quinlan described the film as "grim but gripping".

Andrew Spicer, in his book European Film Noir, wrote: "A riveting psychological study. With its sustained doom-laden atmosphere, Krampf’s expressive cinematography, its adroit mixture of location shooting and Gothic compositions and Ralph Richardson's wonderful performance as a lower middle class Everyman, 'On the Night of the Fire' clearly shows that an achieved mastery of film noir existed in British cinema."

Also in 1939, Hurst and Korda co-directed The Lion Has Wings (1939) featuring Richardson. It was described by one critic as "Hurst's most celebrated film of the 1930s". Hurst went on to make four more propaganda films from 1940 to 1942 and continued to make films set in the Second World War until 1956.

== Later years ==
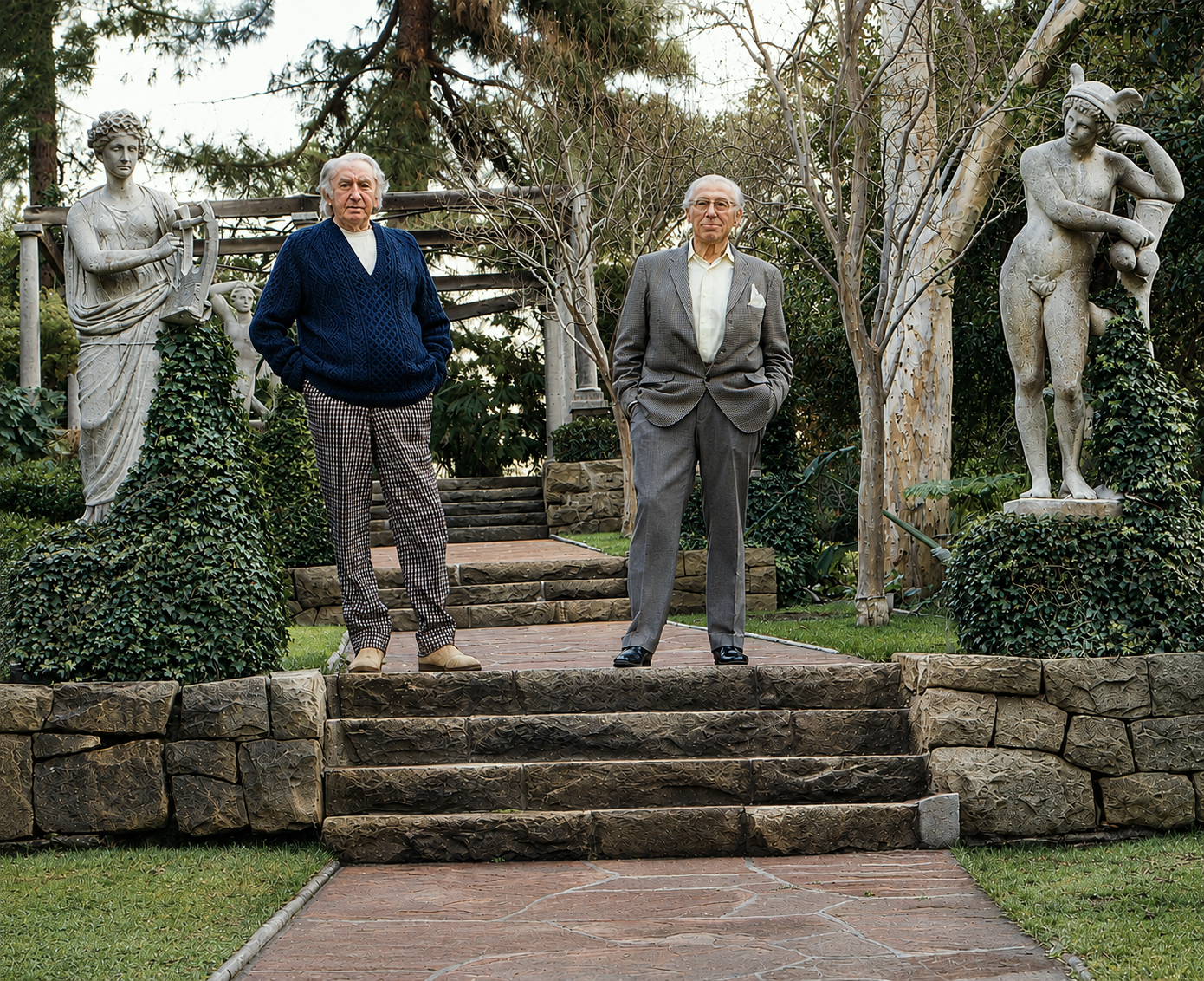
Brian Desmond-Hurst, with George Cukor, in Hollywood. Photograph by Allan Warren.

The Times, in its obituary of Hurst in 1986, commented that Dangerous Moonlight (1941) was his best-known movie, "a big popular success" which "launched a cycle of pictures with concerti as their theme music" because of its successful utilisation of Richard Addinsell's Warsaw Concerto.

Hurst worked for the Ministry of Information during the Second World War, for which his films included A Call for Arms (1940), Miss Grant Goes to the Door (1940) and his homeland film, A Letter From Ulster (1943), in which Hurst, Terence Young (as scriptwriter), and his fellow Ulsterman and Assistant Director, William MacQuitty, created a film "promoting a sense of community" between the people of Northern Ireland and over one hundred thousand troops from the USA based in Northern Ireland at the time. Brian McIlroy explained that "Hurst was able to persuade one Catholic and one Protestant soldier to write letters home, explaining their impressions of their stay. From these letters, Terence Young, the scriptwriter, was able to construct a sequence of activities that revealed the different traditions of Ireland."

Hurst's The Hundred Pound Window (1944) cast a young Richard Attenborough in his first credited role. Hurst directed scenes in Caesar and Cleopatra (1945), in which he gave Roger Moore his first film role, and helped pay for Moore to attend RADA.

For Theirs is the Glory (1946), Hurst took 200 members of the 1st Airborne back to Arnhem and Oosterbeek to direct and "remake" their role in the Battle of Arnhem. Every person in the film served with the 1st Airborne or was a civilian from Oosterbeek or Arnhem. Hurst said, "The film is my favourite because of the wonderful experience of working with soldiers and because it is a true documentary reconstruction of the event. I say without modesty it is one of the best war films ever made".

The premiere of Theirs is the Glory was on the second anniversary of the battle in September 1946 and was attended by the Prime Minister. King George VI commanded a private screening at Balmoral Castle. Theirs is the Glory and A Bridge Too Far were compared in the battlefields magazine Against All Odds and the comparison is stark and revealing "A Bridge Too Far is a slow moving epic, well worth a viewing with some authentic scenes, but is unconvincing in its portrayal of the battle of Oosterbeek ... Theirs is the Glory is the only feature film currently released that accurately portrays the events at Oosterbeek in atmospheric and chronological terms, despite its jerky portrayal of events. This is a film to watch.".

Hurst's post-war career included producing and directing the Christmas film Scrooge (1951) which is the "best of the many screen versions of Dickens's warm-as-mince-pies A Christmas Carol, with Alastair Sim as Scrooge incarnate: his miserly humbuggery is a delight. So is Michael Hordern's ghostly Jacob Marley and the snowy, atmospheric photography of C.M. Pennington-Richards".

Hurst produced Tom Brown's Schooldays (1951) and directed the box office success Malta Story (1953), featuring Alec Guinness as an RAF pilot helping to defend Malta. "The combination of an A list cast, the portrayal of the iron reliance of the Maltese people, the gallantry of the RAF pilots and a tragic love story were the four components of its success".

Hurst went on to direct Simba (1955), featuring Dirk Bogarde and Donald Sinden, and The Black Tent (1956), featuring Donald Pleasence, Anthony Steel and Donald Sinden again. The Black Tent was based on a short story of the same title by Robin Maugham. Hurst also made a period film, Dangerous Exile.

Hurst's Behind the Mask (1958) sees a young Vanessa Redgrave obtaining her first credited role (alongside her father, Sir Michael Redgrave).

Hurst's only excursion into farce was His and Hers (1961), which saw a strong cast of Terry Thomas joining the carry-on stalwarts Kenneth Williams, Joan Sims and Kenneth Connor, supported by Oliver Reed. In 1962, in his late 60s, Hurst returned to John Millington Synge, adapting the script and producing and directing The Playboy of the Western World, his last film.

Hurst gave early film roles to Richard Attenborough, Roger Moore and Vanessa Redgrave. The first four scriptwriting roles of later Bond director Terence Young were for the Hurst-directed films: On the Night of the Fire (1939), A Call For Arms (1940),Dangerous Moonlight (1941) and A Letter From Ulster (1942). They worked together again on the scripts of Theirs is the Glory (1946) and Hungry Hill (1947), and remained good friends.

== Personal life ==
Hurst was gay.

He died on 26 September 1986 at Delaware Nursing Home in London. He was cremated and his ashes were scattered on his older brother Robert's grave in Dundonald Cemetery.

== Recognition and honours ==
The Directors Guild of Great Britain installed a blue plaque at Queens Film Theatre in Belfast for Brian Desmond Hurst, unveiled on 13 April 2011 by the Irish film producer Redmond Morris. On the same date the Ulster History Circle unveiled a blue plaque at Hurst's birthplace, 23 Ribble Street, East Belfast. This plaque was relocated in the summer of 2016 to the nearby Strand Arts Centre and Cinema on 152-154 Holywood Road, Belfast, BT4 1NY.

On 10 October 2012 the First Minister and deputy First Minister of Northern Ireland officially launched an £8.3m extension to Titanic Studios (originally known as the Paint Hall Studios) adding two new sound stages, at the Titanic Quarter. The stages have been named after Hurst and the director William MacQuitty.

== Books on Hurst ==
The Empress of Ireland (Scribner, 2004) by Christopher Robbins is a memoir of Hurst's later years.

Theirs is the Glory: Arnhem, Hurst and Conflict on Film (Helion and Company, 2016) by David Truesdale and Allan Esler Smith is about Hurst's Battle of Arnhem film, his life, and his other war films.

Hurst on Film 1928-1970 (Quartertoten Productions Limited, 2021) edited by Caitlin Smith and Stephen Wyatt, consists of Hurst's memoirs, written in 1976–1977, combined with the first detailed overview of his life and work, and features extensive material drawn from his family archives.

The Last Bohemian: Brian Desmond Hurst, Irish Film, British Cinema (Syracuse University Press, 2023) by Lance Pettitt, is based on "dedicated research, deep and wide, into his life and films".

Brief Encounters: Lesbians and Gays in British Cinema 1930-71 (Cassell, 1996) and Fighting Proud: The Untold Story of the Gay Men Who Served in Two World Wars (Bloomsbury, 2017), both by Stephen Bourne, contain chapters on Hurst.

== Documentaries on Hurst ==
On 6 August 2011, RTÉ Radio One's Documentary on One series broadcast An Irishman Chained to the Truth, a 40-minute programme about Hurst.

The Human Blarney Stone: The Life and Films of Brian Desmond Hurst (2011) documentary was included as an extra on several US releases of Scrooge from VCI.

== Filmography ==
- Hangman's House (1928)
- Arrowsmith (1931)
- The Tell-Tale Heart (1934)
- Irish Hearts (1934)
- Riders to the Sea (1936)
- Ourselves Alone (1936) - the 1920s conflict in Ireland.
- The Tenth Man (1936)
- Sensation (1936)
- Glamorous Night (1937)
- Prison Without Bars (1938)
- On the Night of the Fire (1939)
- The Lion Has Wings (1939), co-directed with Michael Powell: the film depicts conflict at the end of the 1930s and foreshadows the coming war and the vital role of the Royal Air Force.
- A Call For Arms (1940) - a rallying call for war production and to get more women to work in the factories.
- Miss Grant Goes to the Door (1940): preparing the nation for an invasion by Germany.
- Dangerous Moonlight (1941): the fall of Poland and how her airmen came to the rescue of Britain.
- A Letter From Ulster (1942): about the U.S. Army training for the Second World War in Northern Ireland.
- Alibi (1942)
- The Hundred Pound Window (1944)
- Caesar and Cleopatra (1945): Hurst directed some scenes, but took no credit.
- Theirs is the Glory (1946): veterans of the Battle of Arnhem retell their story.
- Hungry Hill (1947)
- The Mark of Cain (1947)
- Trottie True (1949)
- Scrooge (1951)
- Tom Brown's Schooldays (1951) as producer
- Malta Story (1953): the fate of the isolated island of Malta during the Second World War.
- Simba (1955): Kenya, the Mau Mau and the end of colonial rule in the 1950s.
- The Black Tent (1956): a brother's loss and his search for the truth, set in the North African desert during the Second World War.
- Dangerous Exile (1957)
- Behind the Mask (1958)
- His and Hers (1961)
- Playboy of the Western World (1962)
