= The Jigsaw Man (film) =

1983 British film by Terence Young

- Directed by: Terence Young
- Screenplay by: Jo Eisinger
- Based on: The Jigsaw Man by Dorothea Bennett
- Produced by: Ron Carr; Benjamin Fisz; Robert Porter; Mahmud Sipra
- Starring: Michael Caine; Laurence Olivier; Susan George; Robert Powell; Charles Gray
- Cinematography: Freddie Francis
- Edited by: Derek Trigg
- Music by: John Cameron
- Production companies: Evangrove; Nitemeg
- Distributed by: United Film Distribution Company
- Release date: 1983
- Running time: 94 minutes
- Country: United Kingdom
- Language: English

The Jigsaw Man is a 1983 British espionage film starring Michael Caine, Susan George, Laurence Olivier and Robert Powell. It was directed by Terence Young, as the first of the last two films he directed before his death in 1994. The screenplay was written by Jo Eisinger, based on the novel The Jigsaw Man by Dorothea Bennett.

The film was inspired by the story of Kim Philby, a British intelligence officer who was secretly working for the KGB, then defected to the Soviet Union in 1963.

== Plot ==
Sir Philip Kimberly, the former chief of Britain's Secret Intelligence Service who defected to Russia, is given plastic surgery and assigned back home by the KGB to retrieve vital intelligence documents. Once back in the United Kingdom, he escapes his Soviet handlers and sets out for business on his own, leading MI6 and the KGB on a hunt for him and the documents.

== Cast ==
- Michael Caine as Sir Philip Charles Kimberley / Sergei Kuzminsky
- Laurence Olivier as Admiral Sir Gerald Scaith
- Susan George as Penelope Kimberley / Annabelle
- Robert Powell as Jamie Fraser
- Charles Gray as Sir James Chorley
- Vladek Sheybal as General Zorin
- Anthony Dawson as Vicar
- Michael Medwin as Milroy
- Sabine Sun as Doctor Zilenka

== Production ==
Director Terence Young cast Michael Caine to play the lead role of Sir Philip Kimberley. The other major role of Admiral Sir Gerald Scaith went to Laurence Olivier, thus reuniting the two actors who had previously received nominations for the Academy Award for Best Actor for their roles in the acclaimed Sleuth at the 45th Academy Awards in 1972.

The Jigsaw Man had a troubled filming history. Filming began in 1982 but the film hit financial troubles, and was reportedly shut down due to cash difficulties. Olivier, who had been ill on and off since the late 1970s, collapsed on set. He also apparently walked away from the film after receiving no pay, with Caine following not long after. The actors returned when $4 million was secured as financing by Pakistani businessman, filmmaker and best seller author Mahmud Sipra.

Originally Mike Hodges was going to direct The Jigsaw Man, which, if he had cast Caine, would have been Hodges and Caine's third film after their cult classics Get Carter (1971) and Pulp (1972).

There are several uncredited cameos by friends of Olivier and Caine, who were invited to take part when they visited the set. These include Max Bygraves (3rd Policeman), William Walton (Salvation Army band leader), Arthur Negus (Man in trilby) and Sir John Mills as a Cockney bingo-caller. Eileen Atkins was supposed to have leapt out of a wedding cake, but the scene was subsequently cut as it was felt her cardboard and cellophane leotard was too obviously ill-fitting.

End Credits Song - "Only You And I" - Music by Georges Garvarentz. Lyrics by Labi Siffre, Scott English, Sung by Dionne Warwick. Produced by Bob Gaudio. Rhythm arrangement by Jeremy Lubbock and Bob Gaudio. String & horn arrangement by Jeremy Lubbock. Recorded by Paul Lani and Rick Ruggieri. Mixed by Ron Hitchcock. Producers assistant: Marla Miller. Recorded at Sound Lab Studios, Los Angeles, California. Song & theme published by P.G.G. (Chappell Aznavour Ltd.)

== Release ==
The film was rated certificate 15 by the BBFC in August 1983 and was released by Thorn EMI.

The Jigsaw Man was released in DVD format in 2002 by Prism Leisure with the special features being limited to chapter selection options.

== Reception ==
On Rotten Tomatoes, The Jigsaw Man holds a rating of 39% from 18 reviews.
