= Theirs Is the Glory =

- Detailing the battle plans in Theirs Is the Glory
- Directed by: Brian Desmond Hurst
- Written by: Louis Golding and Terence Young
- Produced by: Leonard Castleton Knight
- Cinematography: C. M. Pennington-Richards
- Music by: Guy Warrack
- Production company: Gaumont British
- Distributed by: General Film Distributors
- Release date: 15 August 1946
- Running time: 82 minutes
- Country: United Kingdom
- Language: English

Theirs Is the Glory (also known as Men of Arnhem), is a 1946 British war film about the British 1st Airborne Division's involvement in the Battle of Arnhem (17 to 25 September 1944) during Operation Market Garden in the Second World War. It was the first film to be made about this battle, and the biggest grossing UK war film for nearly a decade. The later film A Bridge Too Far depicts the operation as a whole and includes the British, Polish and American Airborne forces, while Theirs Is the Glory focuses solely on the British forces, and their fight at Oosterbeek and Arnhem.

The film was directed by Brian Desmond Hurst, who was himself a veteran of the First World War, having survived Gallipoli where he had served with the Royal Irish Rifles. The producer was Leonard Castleton Knight, head of Gaumont British News. The script was written primarily by Louis Golding but honed by Hurst's protege Terence Young (who subsequently went on to direct They Were Not Divided and the early Bond films). Young had been in the Irish Guards with the Guards Armoured Division with XXX Corps seeking to relieve Arnhem during the battle and hence the authenticity of the eventual story-line. The veterans who starred in the film also actively collaborated on the script.

== Production ==
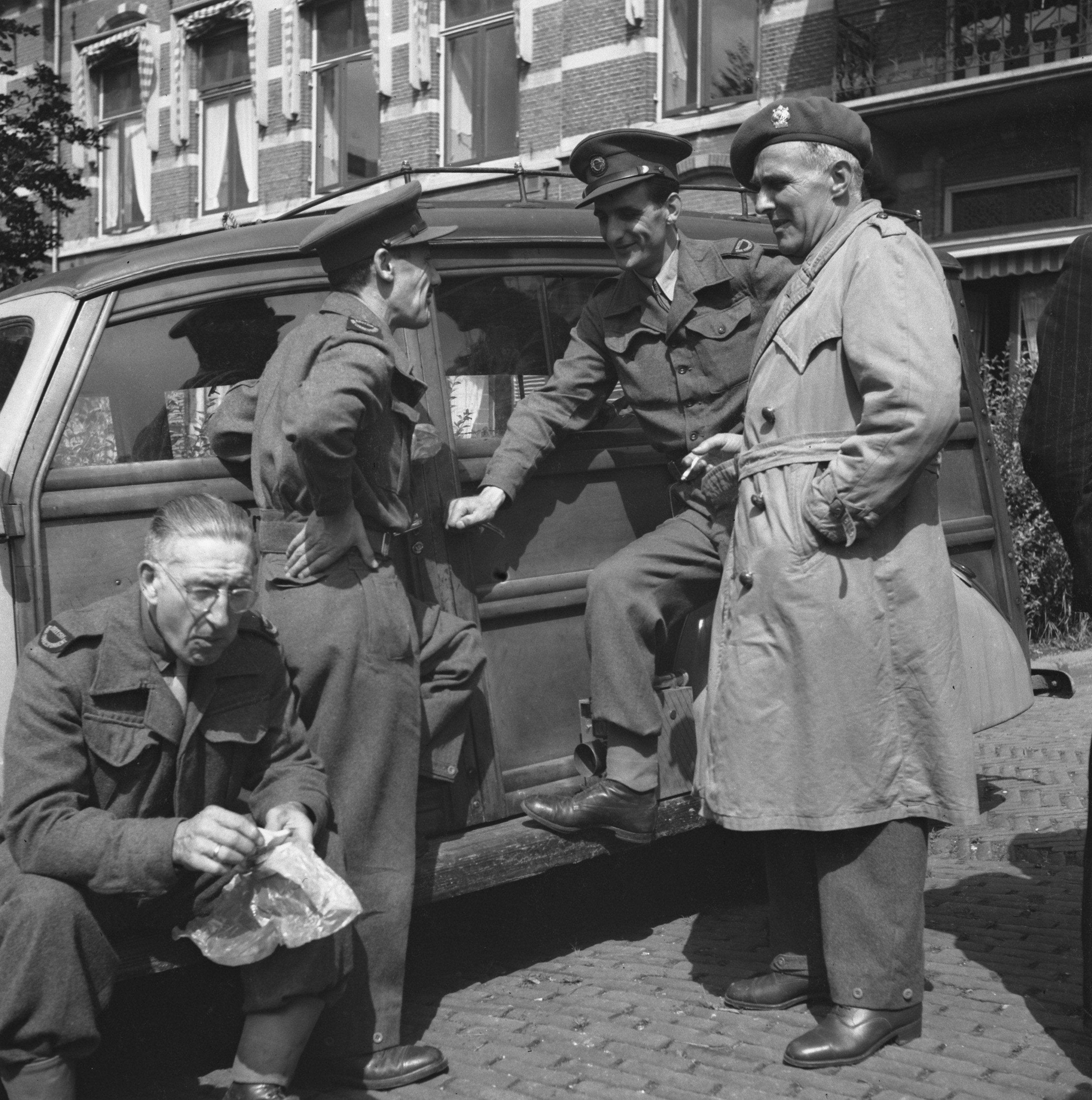
Production of Theirs Is the Glory (1945)

Using the original locations of the battle, the film featured veterans who were actual participants in the battle. The film was jointly produced by the J. Arthur Rank Organisation and the Army Film and Photographic Unit (AFPU).

Weaving original footage from the battle with re-enactments shot on location at Oosterbeek and Arnhem, the film was shot a year after the battle had ravaged the Dutch streets. As well as veterans, the film also features local people like Father Dyker (a Dutch civilian priest who conducts the service in the film) and Kate ter Horst (who reads Psalm 91 to the wounded men in the cellar) re-enacting their roles and what they did for the airborne troops during the battle.

Though no credits appear before or after the film, over 200 veterans appeared as actors, mainly playing themselves, including Lieutenant-Colonel John Frost, Majors CFH "Freddie" Gough and Richard "Dickie" Lonsdale, Lieutenant Hugh Ashmore, Sergeants Jack Bateman and John Daley, Corporal Pearce and Privates Tommy Scullion, Peter Holt, David Parker, George 'Titch' Preston, Frank 'Butch' Dixon, Reginald Spray, Looker and Van Rijssel and Albert Wood and war correspondents Stanley Maxted and Alan Wood. Each veteran was paid £3 per day by the Rank Organisation.

The narrator notes the soldiers as "just ordinary men". "But when you next watch the film look closely at the faces of the men and especially at their eyes in the many close shots that Brian Desmond Hurst arranged. When you look into the eyes you will start to gain a little bit of the experience that those ordinary men went through".

The film may have been the "Help for Heroes of its day". Hurst's biographer, Allan Esler Smith in "Theirs Is the Glory - 65th Anniversary of the filming of the movie" explains that "The popularity of Theirs Is the Glory allowed Arthur Rank, the head of the Rank Organisation, to fulfill his pledge to help the Airborne Forces Security Fund. Collections, raffles and parades rode the wave of enthusiasm that swept the United Kingdom following its premier. The Earl Mountbatten subsequently received a cheque for £50,000 for the Airborne Forces Security Fund from Arthur Rank".

Brian Desmond Hurst said, "The film is my favourite because of the wonderful experience of working with soldiers, and because it is a true documentary reconstruction of the event. I say without modesty it is one of the best war films ever made".

== Reception ==
According to trade papers, the film was a "notable box office attraction" at British cinemas. According to Kinematograph Weekly the 'biggest winner' at the box office in 1946 Britain was The Wicked Lady, with "runners up" being The Bells of St Marys, Piccadilly Incident, The Road to Utopia, Tomorrow is Forever, Brief Encounter, Wonder Man, Anchors Away, Kitty, The Captive Heart, The Corn is Green, Spanish Main, Leave Her to Heaven, Gilda, Caravan, Mildred Pierce, Blue Dahlia, Years Between, O.S.S., Spellbound, Courage of Lassie, My Reputation, London Town, Caesar and Cleopatra, Meet the Navy, Men of Two Worlds, Theirs is the Glory, The Overlanders, and Bedelia.

== Comparison with A Bridge Too Far ==
The two films were compared in the October 2010 magazine Against All Odds and the comparison is stark and revealing, A Bridge Too Far '...is a slow-moving epic, well worth a viewing with some authentic scenes, but is unconvincing in its portrayal of the battle of Oosterbeek... Theirs Is the Glory is the only feature film currently released that accurately portrays the events at Oosterbeek in atmospheric and chronological terms, despite its jerky portrayal of events. This is a film to watch."

== Articles and books ==
Revisiting Theirs Is the Glory by Allan Esler Smith, published by Robert Sigmond Publishing for the 68th Commemoration of the Battle of Arnhem Battlefield Walk, 21 September 2012.

Pegasus the Journal of the Parachute Regiment and Airborne Forces. A multi-part analysis and review of the making of Theirs Is the Glory (Winter 2012 to Winter 2013), by Allan Esler Smith.

Theirs Is the Glory - Arnhem, Hurst and Conflict on Film (2016), by David Truesdale and Allan Esler Smith, takes Hurst's Battle of Arnhem epic as its centrepiece and chronicles Hurst's ten films on conflict.
