= A Bridge Too Far (book) =

1974 book by Cornelius Ryan

- First edition cover
- Author: Cornelius Ryan
- Language: English
- Genre: War
- Publisher: Simon & Schuster (U.S.); Hamish Hamilton (U.K.)
- Publication date: September 1974
- Media type: Print (Hardback)
- Pages: 670
- ISBN: 0-671-21792-5 (U.S.); 0-241-89073-X (U.K.)
- Dewey Decimal: 940.5421
- LC Class: D763.N4 R9

A Bridge Too Far (1974) by Cornelius Ryan gives an account of Operation Market Garden, a failed Allied attempt to break through German lines at Arnhem by taking a series of bridges in the occupied Netherlands during World War II.

Ryan named his book after a comment attributed to Lieutenant General Frederick Browning before the operation, who reportedly said to Field Marshal Bernard Montgomery, "I think we may be going a bridge too far." But Antony Beevor disputes this, saying that Browning had supported the operation, especially in view of receiving more resources. Secondly he did not appear to have encountered Montgomery that day.

Drawing on a wide variety of sources, Ryan documented his account of the 1944 battle with pictures and maps. He included a section on the survivors, "Soldiers and Civilians – What They Do Today".

He addressed tactical mistakes made in planning the operation. Popular accounts of World War II tended to overlook the battle or to accept Field Marshal Montgomery's spin on it as being a "partial success".

The 1974 book was published by Simon & Schuster in New York and by Hamish Hamilton in London. There were frequent later editions, and a film based on it was released in 1977.
