= A Call for Arms =

1940 British short film by Brian Desmond Hurst

A Call For Arms
- Directed by: Brian Desmond Hurst
- Written by: Rodney Ackland Screenplay; Brian Desmond Hurst and Sgt. Terence Young
- Produced by: Brian Desmond Hurst
- Starring: Jean Gillie; Rene Ray; Kathleen Harrison; Colleen Nolan
- Edited by: Ralph Kemplen
- Production company: D & P Studios
- Release date: 1940
- Running time: 8 min.
- Country: United Kingdom
- Language: English

A Call For Arms is a 1940 British short silent propaganda film directed by Brian Desmond Hurst and starring Jean Gillie and Rene Ray. It was written by Rodney Ackland, Hurst and Terence Young, and made for the Ministry of Information. Two "nudes" (showgirls) do their bit for the war effort by going to work in munition factories.

== Plot ==
The film opens with the two showgirls coming across a collapsed munitions worker outside the theatre door. "Twelve hour shifts take it out of some of these young 'uns" observes a nearby news-seller. Alongside a billboard gets the message across "Latest War News. Bigger Arms, Speed up. Go For It". The plots follows one of the showgirls signing up at the Labour Exchange for munitions work and tracks her working day. Seeing her friend exhausted the other showgirl signs up. "We've got to win the war you know".

== Cast ==
- Jean Gillie as Irene
- Rene Ray as Joan
- Kathleen Harrison as Mrs. James
- Colleen Nolan as forewoman
- Vi Caley as newswoman
