= Kate ter Horst =

Dutch resistance member (1906 – 1992)

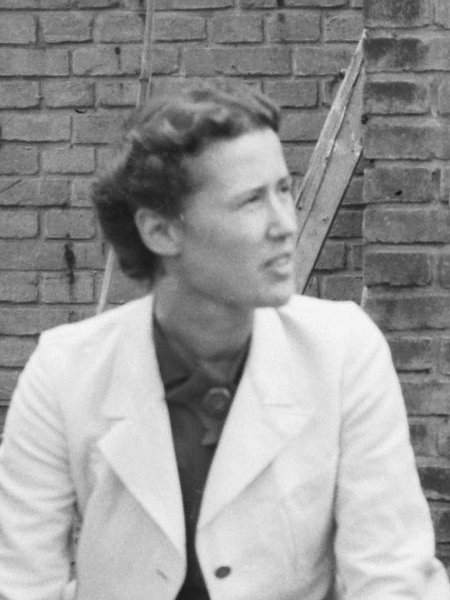
Anje van Maanen (1945)

Kate ter Horst MBE (6 July 1906, Amsterdam – 21 February 1992, Oosterbeek) was a Dutch housewife and mother who tended wounded and dying Allied soldiers during the Battle of Arnhem. Her British patients nicknamed her the Angel of Arnhem.

Ter Horst was born Kate Anna Arriëns, daughter of Pieter Albert Arriëns and Catharina Maingay. She married Jan ter Horst, a lawyer from Rotterdam, with whom she had six children.

== Second World War ==
Kate ter Horst witnessed the landings by the British 1st Airborne Division at the beginning of Operation Market Garden on 17 September 1944, noting the event in her diary.

Mad with joy we walk through the garden and climb up on the roof so we can see more, grasp more of what's happening. We can hardly believe it. Can it really be true? Is this the long-awaited end to our sorrows, falling from the sky? Does this mean freedom?

— Diary of Kate ter Horst

The goal of the operation was for the paratroopers to seize the bridges in and around Eindhoven, Nijmegen and Arnhem. The plan called for the British XXX Corps to advance across these bridges and then push into the Ruhr Valley industrial area of Germany. However, the advance on Arnhem fell behind schedule, and the troops there were forced into a defensive pocket at Oosterbeek.

Captain Randall Martin asked the ter Horsts permission to set up a Regimental Aid Post in their house at the Benedendorpsweg in Oosterbeek.

During the eight days of fighting, ter Horst tended to about 250 wounded British paratroopers herself. Some of her most famous actions in looking after the British troops included walking around her home reading the Bible to dying soldiers and finding water in the most unlikely places (such as the boiler and toilet) when, due to the large concentration of British troops, the house became a target.

Ter Horst wrote about these experiences in a book called Cloud Over Arnhem. Writing the foreword for the book, Arnhem veteran General Sir Frank King noted:

I noticed how the whole room brightened up at her arrival, he recalled. ‘One badly wounded soldier summed it up before he died. After a few words from her, he said: “She’s wonderful. Just like my Mum!” ’

— General Sir Frank King, foreword to Cloud Over Arnhem

== After the war ==
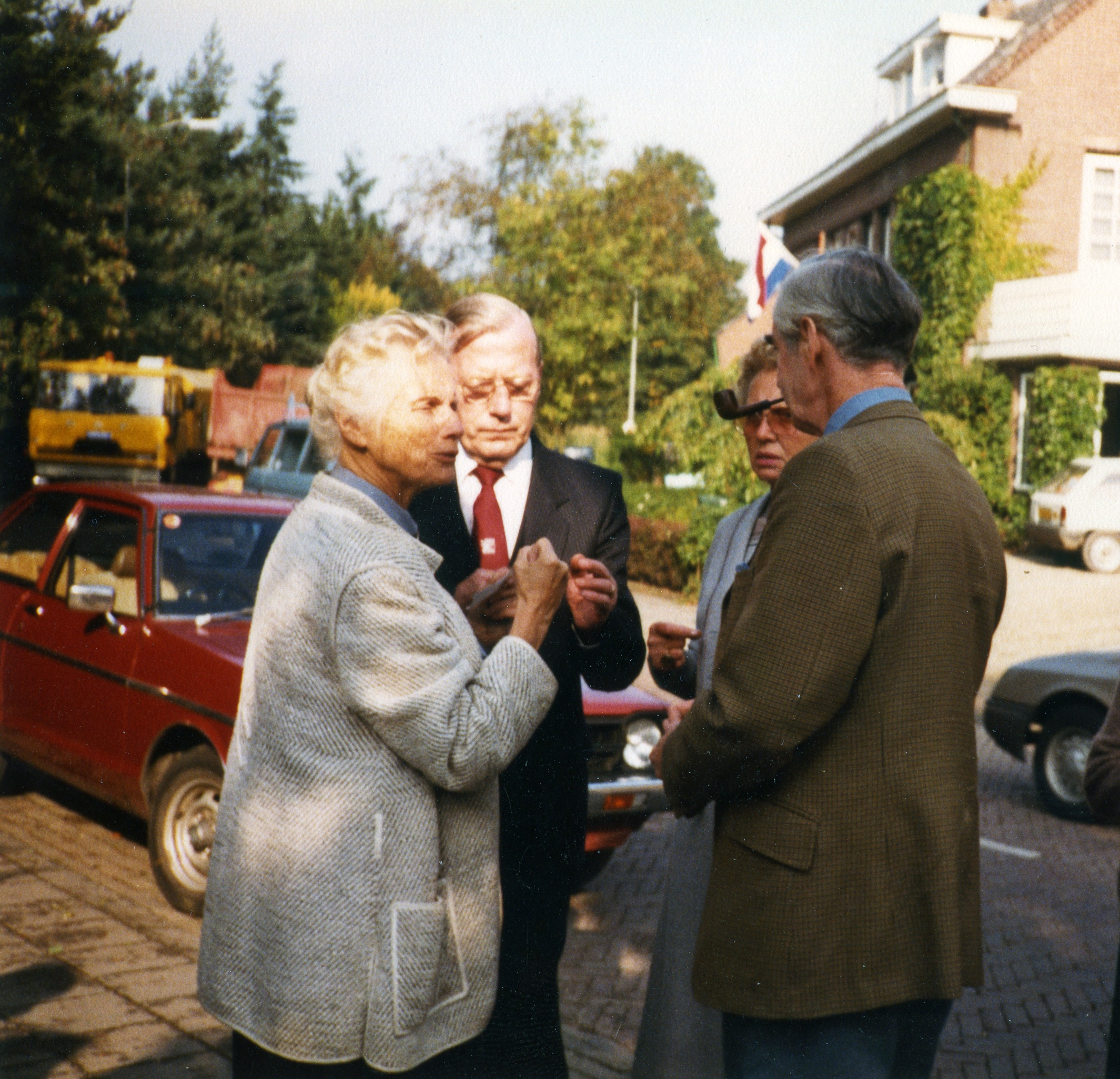
Kate ter Horst talking to veterans of the battle during the 1984 commemorations

In November 1947, her eldest son, Pieter Albert, was killed by a leftover anti-tank mine in a meadow along the Rhine.

She starred in Theirs is the Glory, a film made directly after the war about the battle of Arnhem in which survivors were asked to re-enact the parts they played in the battle.

In 1980, the British ambassador to the Netherlands decorated Kate and her husband as Honorary Members of the Most Excellent Order of the British Empire.

In 1992, Kate ter Horst died after she was struck by a car outside her home. Jan died on 1 August 2003 at the age of 98.

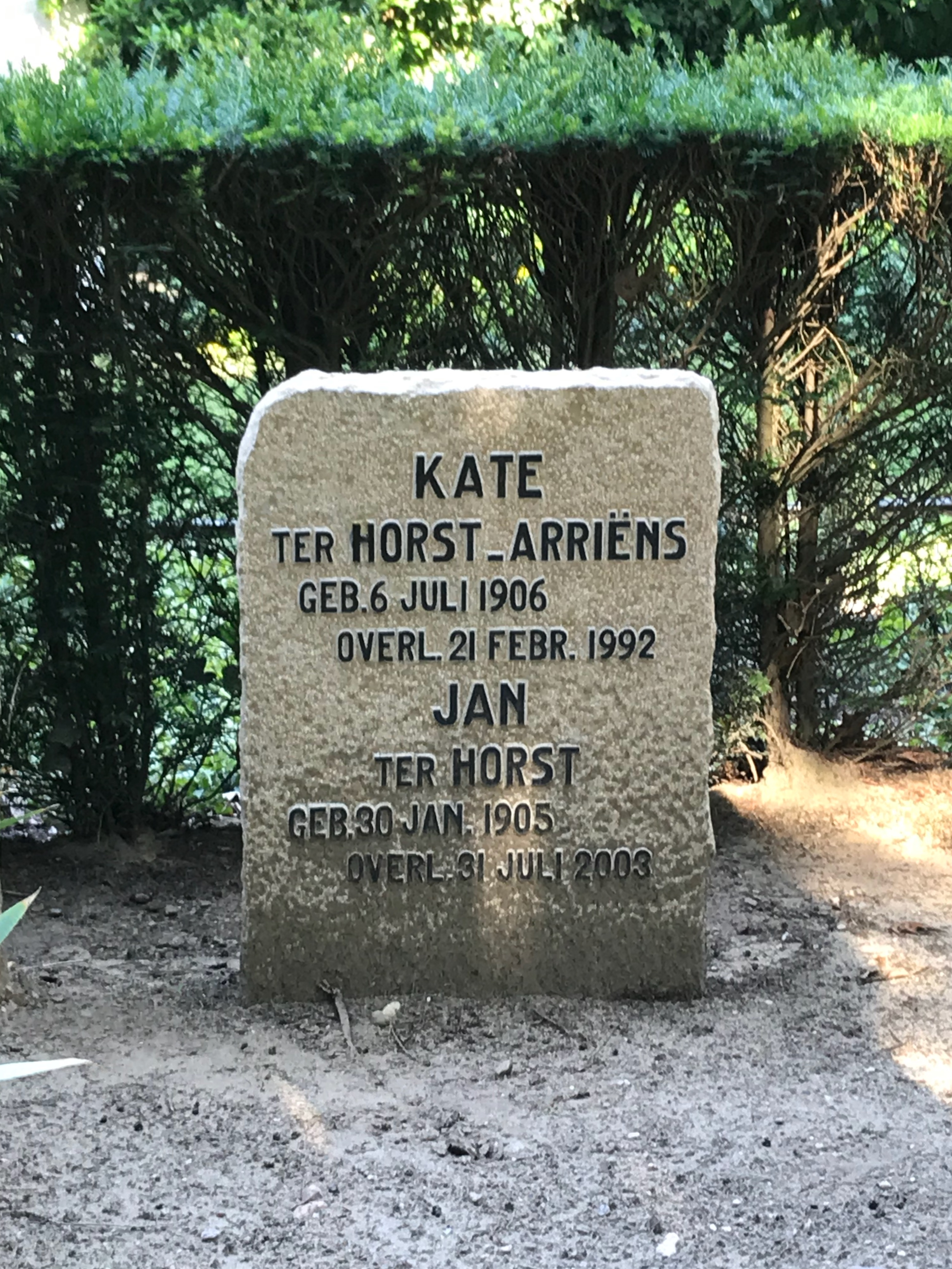
The grave of Kate ter Horst

Following her death, an Early Day Motion was passed by the British House of Commons paying tribute to Kate ter Horst.

Early Day Motion 739

'That this House is sad to learn of the death of Mrs Kate ter Horst who in September 1944 gave aid and refuge to dying and wounded British soldiers trying to liberate Arnhem; recognises she was an exceptionally brave person whose contribution is not forgotten; and sends its condolences to her family'.

— House of Commons business papers/Early Day Motions (3)

== Cultural depictions ==
In the 1977 film A Bridge Too Far she is played by Liv Ullmann.
