= Cornelius Ryan =

Irish-American journalist and military historian (1920–1974)

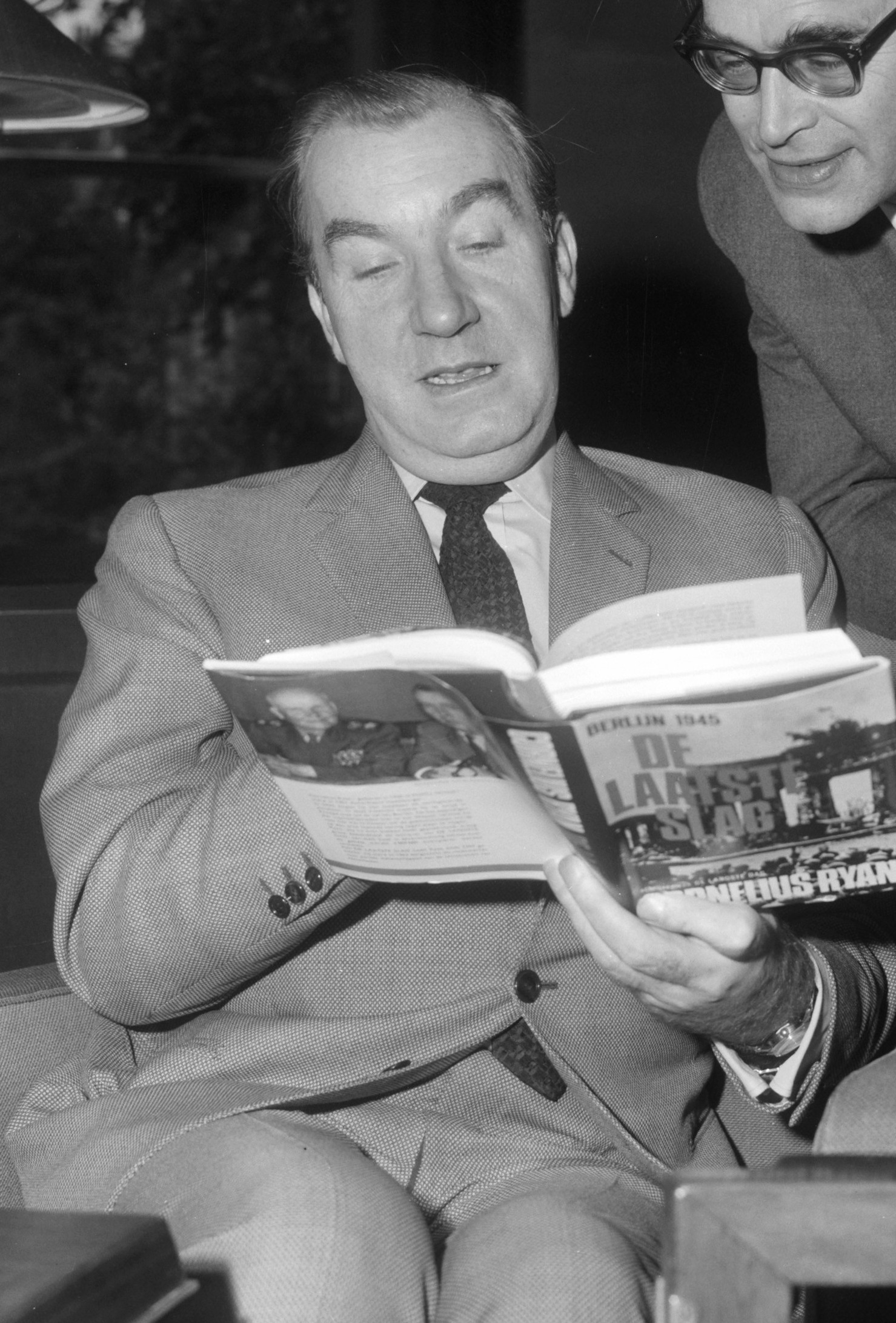
- Ryan in 1966
- Born: 5 June 1920; Dublin, Ireland
- Died: 23 November 1974 (aged 54); New York City, New York, US
- Occupations: Journalist, historian
- Writing career
- Genre: Military history
- Notable work: World War II histories

Cornelius Ryan (5 June 1920 – 23 November 1974) was an Irish and American journalist, author, and historian, known mainly for writing popular military history. He was especially known for his histories of World War II events: The Longest Day: 6 June 1944 D-Day (1959), The Last Battle (1966), and A Bridge Too Far (1974).

Born and raised in Dublin, Ireland, he began working as a journalist in London in 1940. He became involved in covering World War II and travelled with troops in Europe. After the war, he covered the establishment of Israel. He immigrated to the United States in 1947 to work for Time. In 1951, Ryan became a naturalized US citizen and lived there for the remainder of his life.

== Early life and education ==
Ryan was born in Dublin and educated at Synge Street CBS, Portobello, Dublin, Ireland. He was an altar boy at St Kevin's Church, Harrington Street and studied the violin at the Royal Irish Academy of Music. He was a boy scout in the 52nd Troop of the Catholic Boy Scouts of Ireland and travelled on their pilgrimage to Rome on the liner Lancastria in 1934.

== Career ==
=== War correspondent ===
What I write about is not war but the courage of man.

— Cornelius Ryan

Ryan moved to London in 1940, where he became a war correspondent for The Daily Telegraph in 1941. He initially covered the air war in Europe. After the US entered the war, he flew along on fourteen bombing missions with the Eighth and Ninth United States Army Air Forces (USAAF). He joined General George S. Patton's Third Army and covered its actions until the end of the European war in 1945. That year he transferred to the Pacific theater until the war ended there. He travelled to Jerusalem in 1946 to cover the end of the Palestinian mandate and rise of an independent Israel.

Ryan emigrated to the United States in 1947 to work for Time. He reported on the postwar tests of atomic weapons carried out by the United States in the Pacific. He also reported for Time on the Israeli war in 1948. This was followed by work for other magazines, including Collier's Weekly and Reader's Digest.

He married Kathryn Morgan (1925–1993), a novelist. Ryan became a naturalized citizen of the United States in 1951.

=== Military history ===
On a trip to Normandy in 1949, Ryan became interested in telling a more complete story of Operation Overlord than had been produced to that date. He began compiling information and conducting over 1000 interviews as he gathered stories from both the Allies and the Germans, as well as French civilians.

In 1956 he began to write down his World War II notes for The Longest Day: 6 June 1944 D-Day, which tells the story of the D-Day Invasion of Normandy. He completed it and published it in 1959. It was an instant success, and film rights were purchased. Ryan helped to write the screenplay for the subsequent 1962 film adaptation by 20th Century Fox. Darryl F. Zanuck paid the author US$175,000 for the screen rights to the book.

Ryan's 1957 book One Minute to Ditch! is about the successful ocean ditching of a Pan American Boeing 377 Stratocruiser. After publishing an article about the ditching for Collier's in their 21 December 1956, issue, Ryan expanded it and developed it as a book.

His next work was The Last Battle (1966), about the Battle of Berlin. The book contains detailed accounts from all perspectives: civilian, and American, British, Russian and German military. It deals with the fraught military and political situation in mid-1945, when the western Allies and the Soviet Union competed to liberate Berlin and occupy Germany. The book contains echoes of Soviet disinformation about their investigation of the death of Adolf Hitler, namely that they found Hitler's body instead of a body double (along with Hitler's liberated dental remains).

Ryan followed this work with A Bridge Too Far (1974), which tells the story of Operation Market Garden, the ill-fated assault by Allied airborne forces on the Netherlands, culminating in the Battle of Arnhem. This work was also adapted for the cinema and released as a major 1977 film of the same name.

For many years Ryan's editor at Simon & Schuster was Peter Schwed, who was assisted by Michael Korda. Ryan's literary agent was Paul Gitlin.

== Health issues and death ==
He was diagnosed with prostate cancer in 1970, and struggled to finish A Bridge Too Far during his illness. He died in Manhattan, while on tour promoting the book, two months after its publication in 1974. He is buried in the Ridgebury Cemetery in northern Ridgefield, Connecticut.

Four years after his death, his widow Kathryn Morgan Ryan published a memoir about his last years, entitled A Private Battle (1978). She based it on notes that he had secretly left behind for that purpose.

== Legacy and honours ==
- Ryan was awarded the French Legion of Honour.
- He received an honorary Doctor of Literature degree from Ohio University. His papers are kept there as the Cornelius Ryan Collection in the Vernon R. Alden Library.

== Bibliography ==
- 1946. – Star-Spangled Mikado. – with Frank Kelley. – New York City: R.M. McBride. OCLC 1142015
- 1950. – MacArthur: Man of Action. – with Frank Kelley. – Garden City, New York: Doubleday. – OCLC: 1516843
- 1957. – One Minute to Ditch!. – New York: Ballantine Books. – OCLC 24116050
- 1959. – The Longest Day: 6 June 1944 D-Day. – Greenwich, Connecticut: Fawcett Publications. ISBN 0-671-62228-5
- 1966. – The Last Battle. – New York City: Simon & Schuster
  - New English Library (1979) – ISBN 0-450-04433-5.
  - Simon & Schuster; Reprint edition (1995) – ISBN 0684803291
- 1974. – A Bridge Too Far. – New York City: Simon & Schuster. – ISBN 0-671-21792-5
- 1979. – A Private Battle. – Posthumously with Kathryn Morgan Ryan. – New York City: Simon & Schuster. – ISBN 0-671-22594-4
