= Sabine Sun =

French actress (1933–2014)

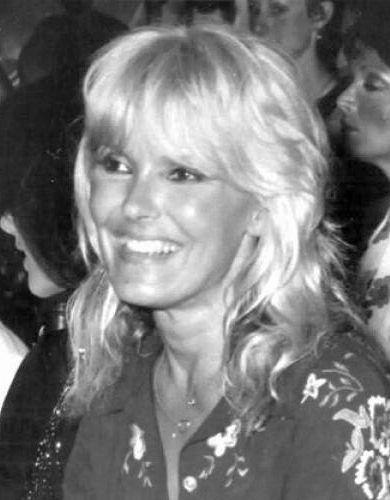
- Sun in 1973
- Born: Marguerite Cheveleff; 15 April 1933; Antibes, France
- Died: 13 May 2014 (aged 81); Gimont, France
- Occupation: Actress
- Years active: 1964–2014

Sabine Sun (15 April 1933 – 13 May 2014) was a French actress. She appeared in more than 40 films from 1964, including several directed by her husband, Terence Young. Sun died in Gimont on 13 May 2014, at the age of 81.

== Filmography ==
- 1961: The Bluffer of Sergio Gobbi
- 1962: Clementine Darling Pierre Chevalier
- 1963: The King of the Village Henri Gruel
- 1963: The Midnight Confession / The Adventures of Salavin Pierre Granier-Deferre
- 1963: Chills all Raoul André
- 1963: Strippers or Women Believed too Easy Jean-Claude Roy
- 1964: Secret Agent FX 18 from Maurice Cloche
- 1964: Click and Slaps Philippe Clair
- 1964: Male Hunt Édouard Molinaro
- 1964: The Gorillas Jean Girault
- 1964: A Girl and Guns Claude Lelouch
- 1964: Angélique, Marquise des Anges Bernard Borderie
- 1965: The Mechanical Piano Juan Antonio Bardem
- 1965: As Long as You've Got Your Health Pierre Etaix
- 1965: The Client's Head Jacques Poitrenaud
- 1965/67: Hell Is Empty John Ainsworth and Bernard Knowles
- 1966: What's New Pussycat? Clive Donner
- 1966: Commissioner X: Stop LSD Frank Kramer (Gianfranco Parolini)
- 1966: The Night of the Generals Anatole Litvak
- 1966 : Trap for the Assassin Riccardo Freda
- 1966: The King of Hearts Philippe de Broca
- 1967: Coplan opens fire in Mexico City - (Entre las redes / Moorish: Obiettivo allucinante) of Riccardo Freda
- 1967: Death Trip Rudolf Zehetgruber/Gianfranco Parolini alias Frank Kramer
- 1967: The 3 Fantastic Supermen Gianfranco Parolini alias Frank Kramer
- 1967: The Lab Crazy 4 Jacques Besnard
- 1967: Three Girls at the Sun Roger Fellous
- 1968: If You Meet Sartana Pray for Your Death Gianfranco Parolini
- 1968: The Gentlemen of the Family Raoul André
- 1969: The Sicilian Clan Henri Verneuil
- 1969: Désirella Jean-Claude Dague
- 1969: Mr. Freedom William Klein
- 1969: The Scarlet Lady
- 1969: Hallucinations sadistic Jean-Pierre Bastid
- 1969: The Libertines Dave Young (Pierre Chenal)
- 1969: Tropic of Cancer of Joseph Strick
- 1970: Cold Sweat
- 1970: Les Saintes beloved of Jean Becker, episode, Eve and her first client
- 1970: Love, yes! but ... - (Love life in Luxembourg) of Philippe Schneider and Franck Apprederis
- 1970: Las piernas de la serpiente of Juan Marchal Xiol
- 1972: Cosa Nostra - The Valachi Papers Terence Young
- 1974: The Amazons/War Goddess Terence Young
- 1981: Inchon Terence Young
- 1983: The Jigsaw Man Terence Young
- 1988: Marathon Run for Your Life of Terence Young
