= Run for Your Life (1988 film) =

- Directed by: Terence Young
- Written by: Robert Brodie Booth
- Based on: Run for Your Life by Tommy Iwering
- Produced by: Tommy Iwering
- Starring: David Carradine; Lauren Hutton; George Segal; Franco Nero; Sabine Sun; Anthony Dawson
- Cinematography: Franco Di Giacomo
- Edited by: Carlo Balestrieri; Michael J. Sheridan
- Music by: Björn J:son Lindh
- Release date: 1988
- Running time: 90 minutes
- Countries: Italy; United Kingdom
- Language: English

Run for Your Life (also known as Marathon) is a 1988 Italian-British sport-drama film. It is the last film directed by Terence Young. It was shot in Rome; during the filming David Carradine married his third wife, Gail Jensen.

== Cast ==
- David Carradine as Major Charles Forsythe
- Lauren Hutton as Sarah Forsythe
- George Segal as Alan Morani
- Franco Nero as Commissare
- Sabine Sun as Ann Moorcroft
- Anthony Dawson as Colonel Moorcroft
- Gregg Stewart as Lieutenant Walker

== See also ==
- List of films about the sport of athletics
