= Ronald Brittain =

British actor (1899–1981)

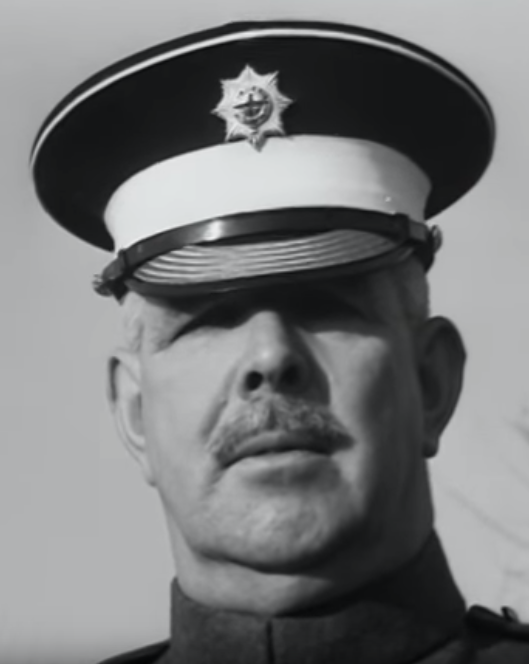
Regimental Sergeant Major, R. Brittain

Ronald Brittain MBE MSM (2 September 1899 – 9 January 1981) was a regimental sergeant major (RSM) in the British Army. Reported on widely in the newspapers of the day, he featured in several British military training films during the Second World War. He was said to have possibly the loudest voice in the British Army.

On retiring from the army in the 1950s, Brittain's fame enabled him to enjoy a career in advertising, voice-over work and acting, playing characters that resembled an archetypal Sergeant Major.

== Early life ==
Brittain was born in Gordon Terrace, Aigburth Vale, Liverpool, the son of a gardener. After leaving school, he worked in a local butcher's shop until 1917, when he enlisted in the King's (Liverpool) Regiment during the First World War.

== Military service ==
Brittain transferred into the South Wales Borderers, where his imposing height of six feet three inches soon saw him promoted. Eventually Brittain transferred to the Coldstream Guards.

He was attached to the training staff at the Royal Military College, Sandhurst, where he became well known for his parade ground bellow. Known to the cadets as "The Voice", he was credited as the originator of that phrase so beloved of sergeant majors: "You 'orrible little man!". It was said he could reduce gentleman cadets — many of them foreign princes and titled sons of the aristocracy — to trembling wrecks.

In his later years, he was assigned the position of Regimental Sergeant Major of the Guards Depot. He also served at Mons Officer Cadet School in Aldershot, where it was estimated that around 40,000 officer cadets passed through his parade ground.

== Retirement ==
In 1954 Brittain retired from the army after 37 years' service (20 years as an RSM); he was well above the normal retirement age for service personnel. After a spell as a salesman for an outsized clothing outfitters, he acted in films and plays. He also lent his legendary voice to a number of radio and television advertisements. In 1959 his voice was featured on a record, "Regimental Rock" released on the Saga label. Still an imposing figure in old age, Brittain was a popular presence at public functions and a member of the Society of Toastmasters.

== Death ==
Brittain died at Chester in 1981, aged 81.

== Award and decorations ==
Member of the Order of the British Empire (MBE)
Defence Medal 1939-1945
War Medal 1939-1945
King George V Silver Jubilee Medal 1935
King George VI Coronation Medal 1937
Queen Elizabeth II Coronation Medal 1953
Army Long Service and Good Conduct Medal with clasp
Meritorious Service Medal

Complete as at 1953.

== Filmography ==
Film or Series	Role	Notes
They Were Not Divided (1950)	Regimental Sergeant Major	
You Lucky People! (1955)	Appearing as himself	
Carrington V.C. (1955)	Sergeant Major	Uncredited
Alfred Marks Time (1956)	Performer	BBC TV Series
The Criminal (1960)	Kitchen warder	
The Missing Note (1961)	Commissionaire	Uncredited
The Inspector	MP Sergeant	
The Amorous Prawn (1962)	Sergeant Major	
55 Days at Peking (1963)	Sergeant Major	Uncredited
The Spy with a Cold Nose (1966)	Commissionaire	
Casino Royale (1967)	Sergeant Major	Uncredited, (final film role)

== Discography ==
Pass in Review -A program of marches of the British Armed Forces that pass in review on the mall with actual sounds of Big Ben, the Cavalry and commands by Regimental Sgt. Major Ronald Brittain, M.B.E. (Somerset)

The Saga Satellites with RSM Brittain - Regimental Rock (Saga Records, 1959)

== Notes ==
Citations

Bibliography

Leasor, James. (1955). The Serjeant-major; a biography of R.S.M. Ronald Brittain, M.B.E., Coldstream Guards. London: Harrap. OCLC 2154501.
