= The Last Battle (Ryan book) =

1966 book by Cornelius Ryan

- First edition
- Author: Cornelius Ryan
- Language: English
- Genre: Non-fiction
- Publisher: Simon & Schuster
- Publication date: 1966

The Last Battle is a 1966 book by Cornelius Ryan about the events leading up to the Battle of Berlin in World War II.

The book, which was published by Simon & Schuster, is structured as an historical narrative. It is based on interviews with hundreds of persons actually involved, including Americans, British, Germans and Soviets. Ryan was granted unique historical access to the Soviet Union’s war archives and to Red Army generals involved in the battle, which was rare at the time.

The book was published simultaneously in the United Kingdom, France, West Germany, Italy, Spain, Norway, Denmark, Sweden, the Netherlands, Finland and Portugal, when it appeared in March 1966.

== Reception ==
The Last Battle made news at the time it was published. The book revealed that the German capture of a top-secret Allied plan for dividing and occupying Germany (Operation Eclipse) helped stiffen German resistance and prolonged World War II.

Also receiving publicity were assertions of an American general quoted in the book, General William Hood Simpson, commander of the Ninth United States Army in World War II, that he is convinced his Army "could have captured Berlin well ahead of the Russians if it had not been stopped on the Elbe River on 15 April 1945".

The Soviet Communist Party newspaper Pravda accused Ryan of trying to smear the Red Army in his depiction of the Battle of Berlin.

After Ryan's death, it was revealed that the author had written to the publisher of the works of Stephen Ambrose, accusing Ambrose of plagiarism: in September 1970, Ryan addressed a letter to Doubleday, alleging the use of two quotations from The Last Battle in the Eisenhower biography The Supreme Commander without proper attribution.

Metro-Goldwyn-Mayer planned a joint American-Soviet co-production film version to be released in 1968 but due to financial trouble experienced by the studio, the project was never produced.
