= War Goddess =

1973 film directed by Terence Young

- Directed by: Terence Young
- Screenplay by: Richard Aubrey
- Story by: Robert Graves; Richard Aubrey
- Produced by: Nino Crisman; Gregorio Sacristán
- Starring: Alena Johnston; Sabine Sun; Luciana Paluzzi
- Cinematography: Aldo Tonti; Alejandro Ulloa
- Edited by: Roger Dwyre
- Music by: Riz Ortolani
- Distributed by: Cinema International Corporation (France)
- Release date: 1973
- Running time: 105 minutes
- Countries: Italy; France; Spain
- Languages: Italian; English dub

War Goddess (also known as The Amazons and The Bare-Breasted Warriors) is a 1973 adventure film directed by Terence Young and starring Alena Johnston, Sabine Sun, Rosanna Yanni, Helga Liné, and Luciana Paluzzi. It was a co-production between Italy (where it was released as Le guerriere dal seno nudo), France (where it is known with the title Les amazones), and Spain (where is it is known as Las amazonas).

== Plot ==
Set nearly three thousand years ago, the Amazons are a tribe of proud warrior women who have established a female-only state. The film begins with the tribe's tournament to select a new queen. Man-hating Antiope defeats her rival Oreitheia in the final wrestling match and becomes queen. Believing the tribe has become lax, Antiope enforces strict discipline, allowing sexual relations with men only annually for procreation and advocating for a more egalitarian society, which Oreitheia and other high-ranking Amazons oppose, leading Oreitheia to plot against Antiope.

Since the tribe lacks men, the Amazons annually hire men from another nation for reproduction, a duty Antiope also participates in. The Amazons then meet Greek soldiers led by King Theseus of Athens for this ceremony. Meanwhile, Oreitheia tries to sabotage Antiope by poisoning her water with aphrodisiac, but her handmaiden drinks it instead. Intrigued by the Amazons, Theseus poses as a low-ranking captain and has sex with Antiope, impregnating her. Much to her surprise, Antiope enjoys the encounter. The next day, during contests between the groups, Antiope injures her leg trying to outdo Theseus in show jumping, preventing her from being intimate with him that night. Theseus apologizes and attempts to change her views on men, but she remains resolute. Secretly developing feelings for Theseus and fearing appearing weak, Antiope orders an early departure.

The king suggests a route through the Blue Mountains, inadvertently leading the tribe into a Scythian ambush. Realizing his error, Theseus gathers soldiers to help the Amazons fight off the Scythians. Believing the Greeks orchestrated the attack, the Amazons, led by Oreitheia, raid Scythian villages in retaliation. Over the following months, Theseus falls in love with Antiope and camps near the Amazon city. He saves her from an assassination attempt and later sneaks into her chambers for another encounter, which she reluctantly accepts. Theseus also sends his wife, Queen Phaedra, to the city as a supposed feminist representative from Crete to learn about the Amazon society. Suspicious, Antiope's followers track Phaedra back to Theseus's camp, revealing his deception. Seeing him with another woman, Antiope feels used and ends their relationship, planning revenge. Their cover blown, Theseus and Phaedra return to Athens.

Antiope gives birth to a son, a disappointment as male children are unwanted by the Amazons and left to die. The apparent loss of her child causes Antiope to become conflicted and more vocal upon Oreitheia's successful return from the Scythian campaign, losing some support among her tribe. Exploiting this, Oreitheia tries to murder Antiope in her sleep, but Antiope anticipates the betrayal. They engage in a nude wrestling match during a thunderstorm, but exhausted, they ultimately embrace and become lovers.

Antiope arranges another meeting with the Greeks, intending to mate and then kill them in revenge for the ambush. Despite grim prophecies from their priests, Oreitheia encourages her. Antiope and Theseus reunite, and he confesses his love. After their intimacy, Theseus reveals he knew about the assassination plot from treacherous Amazons and that he rescued their son, Hippolytus. Antiope secretly leaves to see her child in Athens. The other Amazons, except Oreitheia and a few others, believe she was kidnapped and pursue the Greeks to prevent news of this dishonor from spreading. The Amazons catch up, and a battle ensues. To protect Antiope, Theseus has her tied to a carriage against her will. Both sides suffer casualties, and Antiope helplessly witnesses Oreitheia's death. Deciding there has been enough bloodshed, Theseus stops the fighting. In the aftermath, Antiope, recognizing Oreitheia's ambition, places the queen's ring on her finger. Having been defeated, Antiope and the surviving Amazons join the Greeks on their journey to Athens. Though saddened by her and the Amazons' downfall, Antiope looks forward to her role as Theseus's political advisor and is relieved to learn Phaedra is his wife, not his lover.

== Cast ==
- Alena Johnston as Antiope
- Sabine Sun as Oreitheia
- Rosanna Yanni as Penthesilea
- Helga Liné as High Priestess
- Rebecca Potok as Melanippe
- Malisa Longo as Leuthera
- Lucy Tiller as Alana
- Almut Berg as Cynara
- Luciana Paluzzi as Phaedra
- Angelo Infanti as Theseus
- Fausto Tozzi as General
- Benito Stefanelli as Commander
- Ángel del Pozo as Captain
- Franco Borelli as Perithous
