= A Letter from Ulster =

- Title card
- Directed by: Brian Desmond Hurst
- Written by: Shaun Terence Young
- Produced by: William MacQuitty
- Cinematography: H. E. Fowle
- Edited by: Donald Ginsberg
- Music by: William Alwyn
- Production company: Crown Film Unit
- Distributed by: Ministry of Information
- Release date: 1942
- Running time: 33 minutes
- Country: United Kingdom
- Language: English

A Letter from Ulster is a 1942 documentary by Ulster-born movie director Brian Desmond Hurst who, along with his lifelong friend Terence Young (scriptwriter) and fellow Ulsterman and Assistant Director William (Bill) MacQuitty, created this film promoting a sense of community between the people of Northern Ireland and over one hundred thousand troops from the US based in Northern Ireland at the time. William Alwyn provided music.

In 1942, tensions between the US troops and the local population were allegedly being stirred up by propaganda from German spies in Dublin. Hurst's brief was simple- to make a documentary to show that everyone was getting along fine.

Brian McIlroy in Chapter 3 of Re-viewing British Cinema 1900 - 1992: Essays and Interviews explained that "Hurst was able to persuade one Catholic and one Protestant soldier to write letters home, explaining their impressions of their stay. From these letters, Terence Young, the scriptwriter, was able to construct a sequence of activities that revealed the different traditions of Ireland".

The film follows American soldiers from the US Army 34th Infantry Division as they train for war and enjoy the local hospitality. The two men who write home about their experiences take a tour of their new homeland in their little jeep and visit St Mary's Church in Belfast, Gray Printers in Strabane, Carrickfergus Castle, and Roaring Meg on Derry's walls. They also travel by rail although the railway station seen is not Coleraine as portrayed in the film (even the station master's hat is correct) it is actually Cultra in North Down. They even manage to stray across the border with the South of Ireland towards Glaslough at one stage and are politely turned back. We also see them in their barracks at Tynan Abbey and undertaking tank and artillery exercises across the rolling landscape of Northern Ireland and the Sperrins can be seen in some footage. The artillery scenes used men from the 151st Field Artillery from Minnesota who, significantly, fired the first artillery shell of US Forces in the European Theatre of War in the Sperrins. The men we see went on to fight in some of the bloodiest battles of World War II including Anzio and Monte Cassino.

The film also captures the cartoonist Bruce Bairnsfather (creator of 'Old Bill' during WW1) in a brief cameo whilst he was attached to the US Army. His work subsequently appears in the book of cartoons Jeeps and Jests which includes a cartoon of Brian Desmond Hurst filming A Letter From Ulster.

In September 2011 Brian Desmond Hurst's relative and biographer Allan Esler Smith produced a short documentary, Revisiting A Letter From Ulster (directed by Adam Jones-Lloyd), featuring then and now footage and retracing the steps of the men from the 34th Infantry Division. The documentary premiered at the Aspects Festival in Ireland and was run on a loop for five days together with the original A Letter From Ulster and is now available to view (see link below).

To mark the 70th anniversary year of the US troops arrival in Northern Ireland to prepare for the War in Europe the Northern Ireland War Memorial Museum (Talbot Street, Belfast) screened Brian Desmond Hurst's classic documentary A Letter From Ulster throughout September and October 2012. This supported their ongoing permanent exhibition dedicated to the US troops that trained in Northern Ireland during the Second World War.

== Articles and books ==
Revisiting A Letter From Ulster by Allan Esler Smith published on 6 September 2012 by Northern Ireland War Memorial http://www.briandesmondhurst.org/letterfromulster.html

Theirs is the Glory: Arnhem, Hurst and Conflict on Film takes Hurst's Battle of Arnhem epic as its centrepiece and then chronicles Hurst's life and experiences during the First World War and profiles each of his other nine films on conflict, including A Letter from Ulster.
