= Dorothea Bennett (novelist) =

British novelist and screenwriter (1914-1985)

- Born: Dorothea Alice Bennett; 28 January 1914
- Died: 1 May 1985 (aged 71)
- Occupations: novelist and screenwriter
- Spouse(s): Sir Francis Cook (m. 1933; div. 1935) Erik Martin Rüzt-Nissen (m. 1935; div. 1942) Terence Young (m. 1942)
- Relatives: Diana Warwick (daughter-in-law)

Dorothea "Dosia" Alice Bennett (28 January 1914 – May 1985) was a novelist and screenwriter married to Terence Young.

== Early life ==
Bennett was daughter of Colonel William Bennett, DSO, OBE, MBChM, of Belbins, Romsey, Hampshire, who served in the Royal Army Medical Corps, and his wife Kate Eileen, dau. of Rev. James Johnston Stoney, of Tipperary, from a minor landed gentry family of Oakley Park, County Offaly, a branch of the Stoney family of Borrisokane from which also came Andrew Robinson Stoney. The Bennetts were from Clonakilty, County Cork, where her grandfather had been a doctor. Her brother, William Johnstone Stoney, was an Army Major.

== Career ==
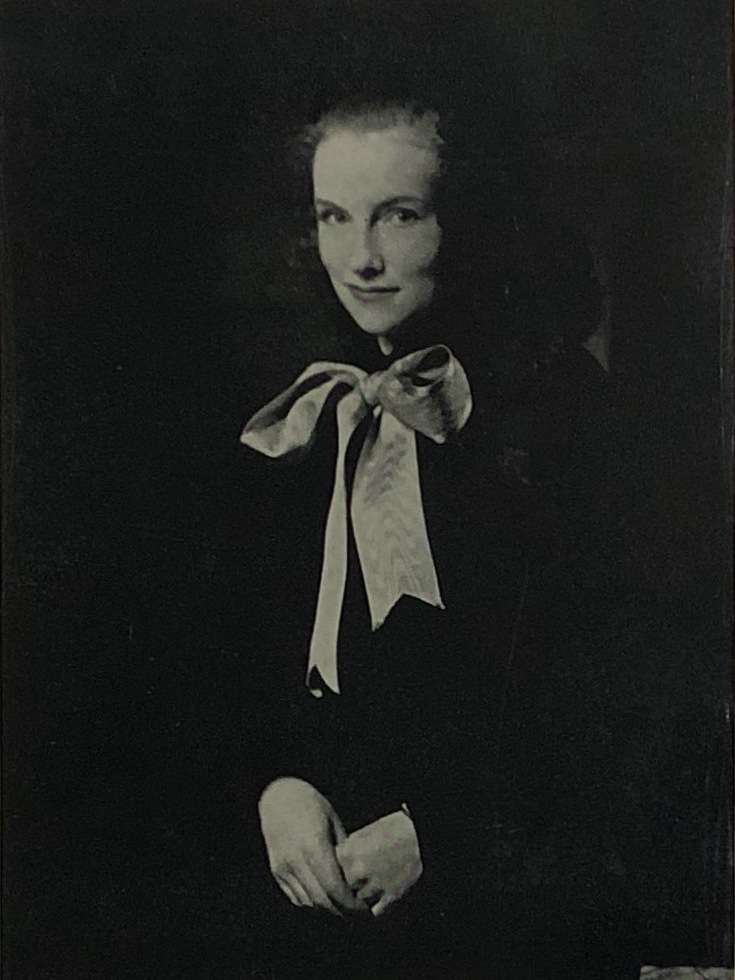
Picture of Bennett on the dust jacket of the U.S. edition of her book Under the Skin

She is largely known for her 1977 novel The Jigsaw Man on which the 1983 film of the same name, directed by her husband, Terence Young, was based, as well as for other film work.

== Personal life ==
She was married to the artist Francis Cook from 1933 to their divorce in 1935, in which year she married playwright and author Erik Martin Rüzt-Nissen, brother of the film and stage actress Greta Nissen. Bennett and Nissen had a daughter, Juliet, together before separating in 1937. Bennett had also had a relationship with Sam Spiegel whilst married to Cook, with Spiegel making off with her signed first editions of works by George Bernard Shaw and a new car during their relationship.

In June 1942 the Norwegian government-in-exile issued a dissolution of Bennett's marriage to Nissen. Five days later, she married the director Terence Young. Nissen, however, sued for a divorce from Bennett 12 years after the dissolution alleging that it had been invalid, and listing Young as the correspondent. The first-instance court found in Nissen's favour before the decision was overturned on appeal and Bennett's original divorce from Nissen was found valid.

Their son, Sean Terence Bowes Young (1943-2021), married the politician Diana Warwick, Baroness Warwick of Undercliffe.

== Bibliography ==
- The Dry Taste of Fear (1960)
- Under the Skin (1961)
- The Jigsaw Man (1977) filmed as The Jigsaw Man
- The Maynard Hayes Affair (1979)
- Greek Girl (1984)
