= They Were Not Divided =

1950 film

- Theatrical poster
- Directed by: Terence Young
- Written by: Terence Young
- Produced by: Herbert Smith
- Starring: Ralph Clanton; Edward Underdown
- Cinematography: Harry Waxman
- Edited by: Vera Campbell; Ralph Kemplen
- Music by: Lambert Williamson
- Production company: Two Cities Films
- Distributed by: General Film Distributors
- Release date: 29 March 1950
- Running time: 137 minutes
- Country: United Kingdom
- Language: English
- Budget: £140,000
- Box office: £167,000

They Were Not Divided is a 1950 British war film, which depicted the Guards Armoured Division in Second World War Europe. It was written and directed by Terence Young, a former Guards officer who served in the campaigns depicted in the film.

The cast consists of little known professional actors, and real soldiers with speaking parts. The film stars Edward Underdown, Ralph Clanton and Michael Trubshawe. Two supporting actors who became famous later on are Christopher Lee as tank commander Chris Lewis and Desmond Llewelyn as tank gunner '77 Jones. Anthony Dawson later made appearances in a large number of Terence Young's films.

Sections of the action are interspersed with documentary footage from the war creating the "scene-setting".

== Plot ==
During the middle years of the war, three men are called up to serve in the British Army. Englishman Philip Hamilton, American David Morgan and Irishman Smoke O'Connor are conscripted into the Guards Division and report to their barracks at Caterham, Surrey. After going through strict training (including with real Coldstream Guards Regimental Sergeant Major Ronald Brittain) they find themselves receiving emergency promotions. Philip and David are promoted to 2nd lieutenant and Smoke to corporal and they are attached to a tank company of the Welsh Guards, where Philip and David command their own tank and Smoke is part of David's crew. Months of training follow, where they learn about tank warfare and also their comrades.

The film follows the three characters as the Guards Armoured Division lands at Normandy weeks after D-Day, and on into action as part of the break-out. Following the crew of a Sherman tank, they cope with different aspects of fighting a war on another continent, such as being separated from family and loved ones and coping with the loss of comrades. Operation Market Garden and the Battle of the Bulge are depicted, but with the Welsh Guards as the pivotal British Army unit. During Market Garden, the Welsh Guards are shown linking up with American paratroopers at the Grave bridge before moving on to Nijmegen and the failure of the operation. The film ends with the Ardennes Offensive and the Guards' unknown operations around the east side of the River Meuse, and only Smoke left alive of the three friends.

== Cast ==
- Edward Underdown as Philip Hamilton
- Ralph Clanton as David Morgan
- Helen Cherry as Wilhelmina
- Stella Andrew as Jane
- Michael Brennan as Smoke O’Connor
- Michael Trubshawe as Major Bushey Noble
- Rupert Gerard as Earl of Bentham
- John Wynn as ’45 Jones
- Desmond Llewelyn as ’77 Jones
- Anthony Dawson as Michael
- Estelle Brody as War Correspondent
- Rufus Cruikshank as Sergeant Dean
- R.S.M. Brittain as Regimental Sergeant Major
- Christopher Lee as Chris Lewis
- Charles Stuart Payton as Corporal Instructor

== Production ==
It was the first war movie made by Earl St John.

While the staged dramatic portions of They Were Not Divided exclusively utilized the Guards Armoured Division, Terence Young relied heavily on genuine Imperial War Museum (IWM) archive footage to ground the film's large-scale movements in reality. Because the British 24th Lancers were heavily filmed by the Army Film and Photographic Unit (AFPU) during their intensive pre-invasion preparations at Hursley Park and their subsequent embarkation, their actual men, Shermans, and distinctive tactical markings were immortalized right there in the movie's montages.

A large number of actual Second World War armoured vehicles are featured or make brief appearances, including scenes featuring a German Tiger tank (namely Tiger 131) and a disabled Panther.

== Reception ==
Trade papers called the film a "notable box office attraction" in British cinemas in 1950. According to one account it was one of the most popular British films of the year along with The Happiest Days of Your Life, Morning Departure, Odette and The Wooden Horse. According to Kinematograph Weekly, the 'biggest winners' at the box office in 1950 Britain were The Blue Lamp, The Happiest Days of Your Life, Annie Get Your Gun, The Wooden Horse, Treasure Island and Odette, with "runners up" being Stage Fright, White Heat, They Were Not Divided, Trio, Morning Departure, Destination Moon, Sands of Iwo Jima, Little Women, The Forsyte Saga, Father of the Bride, Neptune's Daughter, The Dancing Years, Red Light, Rogues of Sherwood Forest, Fancy Pants, Copper Canyon, State Secret, The Cure for Love, My Foolish Heart, Stromboli, Cheaper by the Dozen, Pinky, Three Came Home, Broken Arrow and The Black Rose.
