= Miss Grant Goes to the Door =

- Directed by: Brian Desmond Hurst
- Written by: Rodney Ackland Screenplay; Thorold Dickinson Story; Donald Bull Story
- Produced by: Brian Desmond Hurst
- Starring: Ivan Brandt; Mary Clare; Martita Hunt; Manning Whiley
- Edited by: Ralph Kemplen
- Production companies: D&P Studios
- Release date: 5 August 1940
- Running time: 7 min.
- Country: United Kingdom
- Language: English

Miss Grant Goes to the Door is a 1940 British short propaganda film directed by Brian Desmond Hurst and starring Mary Clare and Martita Hunt. It was written by Rodney Ackland based on a story by Thorold Dickinson and Donald Bull and made for the British Ministry of Information. The film addresses the threat of invasion, and was intended to inspire confidence and convey the message "Keep your heads".

== Plot ==
The film opens with sisters Caroline and Edith Grant preparing to shelter in their cellar following an air raid warning. When a man in uniform collapses outside their cottage, they bring him into their home and lay him down on their sofa. When he dies, they realise that the man is a German parachutist and, hearing the church bells tolling to warn of invasion, Caroline takes his revolver from him.

Soon afterwards, a British army officer arrives asking for a map to help him find his unit. In reality, however, this is a German spy, who is exposed when mis-pronouncing "Jarvis Cross" as "Yarvis Cross". Caroline turns the dead parachutist's revolver on him and guards him, while sending Edith to seek assistance from the ARP. When Edith informs the ARP warden of the situation, he calls the Local Defence Volunteers (LDV, later to become the Home Guard), interrupting a lecture on German parachutists.

The film returns to the Grants' cottage, where the spy engineers his escape from Caroline by asking her for a cigarette. While she finds one, he knocks the gun out of her hands and flees the cottage. His flight is short-lived, however, because the Grants have immobilised their car and locked up their spare bicycle. He is thus apprehended by the LDV, who also destroy a parachute weapons canister. The final scene depicts the Grants thanking a member of the LDV over a cup of tea in their cottage, and he commends their actions with the words: "You kept your heads. The front line is in every home nowadays".

== Cast ==
- Mary Clare as Caroline
- Martita Hunt as Edith
- Manning Whiley as the officer
- Ivan Brandt as the LDV

== Production and background ==
Miss Grant Goes to the Door was one of a number of films which addressed the threat of invasion, with the intention of being both instructional and reassuring. The film thus includes many details which demonstrated the importance of following the advice that had been issued by the Ministry of Information. Citizens were to follow the example of the Grants and immobilise their vehicles, keep maps locked away and refuse to give geographical information to strangers. The Grants also keep the spy talking, which exposes him as a German. The LDV's concluding words to the Grants, "You kept your heads", also reflected advice given to citizens in Ministry of Information leaflets.

The film was produced quickly, which was necessary if its content was to be relevant. It was completed on 2 July and released on 5 August 1940. Nevertheless, by the time of its release, there were already errors in it: The LDV had been renamed the "Home Guard" and the threat of invasion was receding.

== Reception ==
Overall, the film was a success and well-liked for its drama. However, the film was less well received in terms of its instructional element. Reviewers highlighted the fact that the film was flawed in terms of the advice it offered because "most of us have no revolvers" and in the event of invasion, they could not rely on dead Germans to supply them. Some members of the War Office considered the film "too frightening".

== Bibliography ==
- Anthony Aldgate and Jeffrey Richards, Britain Can Take It: British Cinema in the Second World War
- Penny Summerfield and C.M. Peniston-Bird, Contesting Home Defence
