= A Bridge Too Far (film) =

1977 film by Richard Attenborough

- Original film poster
- Directed by: Richard Attenborough
- Screenplay by: William Goldman
- Based on: A Bridge Too Far (1974 book) by Cornelius Ryan
- Produced by: Joseph E. Levine; Richard P. Levine
- Starring: Dirk Bogarde; James Caan; Michael Caine; Sean Connery; Edward Fox; Elliott Gould; Gene Hackman; Anthony Hopkins; Hardy Krüger; Laurence Olivier; Ryan O'Neal; Robert Redford; Maximilian Schell; Liv Ullmann
- Cinematography: Geoffrey Unsworth
- Edited by: Antony Gibbs
- Music by: John Addison
- Production company: Joseph E. Levine Productions
- Distributed by: United Artists
- Release date: 15 June 1977
- Running time: 176 minutes
- Countries: United Kingdom; United States
- Languages: English; German; Dutch
- Budget: $25 million
- Box office: $50.7 million

A Bridge Too Far is a 1977 epic war film directed by Richard Attenborough. It depicts Operation Market Garden, a failed Allied operation in the Nazi-occupied Netherlands during World War II; the film's screenplay, by William Goldman, is based on a book of the same title by historian Cornelius Ryan. It stars an ensemble cast, featuring Dirk Bogarde, James Caan, Michael Caine, Sean Connery, Edward Fox, Elliott Gould, Gene Hackman, Anthony Hopkins, Hardy Krüger, Laurence Olivier, Ryan O'Neal, Robert Redford, Maximilian Schell and Liv Ullmann.

Independently produced by Attenborough and Joseph E. Levine, it was the second film based on a book by Ryan to be adapted for the screen (after The Longest Day (1962)). It was the second film based on the events of Operation Market Garden, following Theirs Is the Glory (1946). A co-production between the United Kingdom and the United States, the film was shot on location in the Netherlands, in many of the real locations where the historical events took place.

Although released to a tepid critical response, A Bridge Too Far received several awards. At the 31st BAFTA Awards it won four out of eight nominated categories, including Best Supporting Actor for Edward Fox and Best Score for John Addison—who himself had served in the British XXX Corps during Market Garden. Attenborough was nominated for Best Direction, and the film was nominated for Best Motion Picture. It was a success at the box office, becoming the sixth-most popular movie of 1977.

== Plot ==
In September 1944, Allied forces have won the Battle of Normandy. General Browning, with the approval of Field Marshal Montgomery, drafts a plan known as Operation Market Garden which will land 35,000 paratroopers and glider men 300 miles (480 km) from their airfields in England, behind enemy lines in the Netherlands over a 64-mile corridor with the ultimate goal of crossing the Rhine River at Arnhem. The single road linking a succession of bridges is narrow and exposed. Two American divisions land near Eindhoven, Grave and Nijmegen. A British division under Major-General Roy Urquhart, is to land near Arnhem, supported by a brigade of Polish paratroopers under General Stanisław Sosabowski. The land forces from XXX Armoured Corps are to pierce the front line in Belgium, cross the captured bridges and relieve the forces at Arnhem within two days.

Major-General Urquhart's officers are surprised their landing zones are so far from their objectives. While consensus is that resistance will consist of inexperienced old men and Hitler Youth, reconnaissance photos show German tanks at Arnhem. General Browning dismisses the photos and ignores reports from the Dutch underground.

Although the airborne drops surprise the enemy and meet little resistance, the Son bridge is demolished by the Germans just before it can be secured. At Arnhem, heavily armed jeeps either do not arrive or are destroyed in an ambush. The British division's radios do not function leaving Urquhart out of contact with Browning's headquarters. The progress of XXX Corps is slowed by German resistance, the narrowness of the road, and the need to construct a Bailey bridge to replace the bridge at Son. They are halted by fierce resistance at Nijmegen and soldiers of the 82nd Airborne Division perform a daylight river crossing in rubber boats to capture the Nijmegen bridge but XXX Corps remains delayed while infantry secure the city.

The Germans close in on the isolated British paratroopers occupying Arnhem near the bridge, and although Sosabowski's troops finally arrive after being delayed in England, they are too late to reinforce the British. After days of intense fighting against SS infantry and panzers the outgunned troops are either captured or forced to withdraw to Oosterbeek. Urquhart receives orders to retreat, while the other Allied commanders blame the various difficulties encountered for their failure to provide support. Urquhart escapes with less than a fifth of his original 10,000 troops while those who are too badly injured to flee stay behind to cover the withdrawal. At British headquarters, Urquhart confronts Browning about his personal sentiments regarding the operation and the latter contradicts his earlier optimism.

Back in Oosterbeek Kate ter Horst, whose home has been converted into a makeshift hospital by the British, abandons its ruins. Passing through the front yard, now a graveyard for fallen troops, she and her children leave with an elderly doctor, pulling a few possessions in a cart, while wounded British troops sing "Abide with Me" as they await capture.

== Cast and roles ==
Note: Characters ordered by rank

=== British ===
Actor	Character	Based on	Notes
Dirk Bogarde	Lieutenant-General Frederick 'Boy' Browning	—N/a	GOC I British Airborne Corps, and at HQ First Allied Airborne Army as its deputy commander, British Army at Nijmegen.
Edward Fox	Lieutenant-General Brian Horrocks	—N/a	GOC, XXX Corps, (Note: Carried the primary responsibility for the 'Garden' ground offensive part of the operation) British Second Army.
Sean Connery	Major-General Roy Urquhart	—N/a	GOC, 1st British Airborne Division, Arnhem
Donald Douglas	Brigadier Gerald Lathbury	—N/a	Brigade Commander, 1st Parachute Brigade, British Army in Arnhem.
Gerald Sim	Colonel Sims	Arthur Austin Eagger	Senior Medical Officer, 1st Airborne Corps, RAMC, British Army.
Richard Kane	Colonel Weaver	Graeme Warrack	Senior Medical Officer, Headquarters RAMC, 1st British Airborne Division, at the Main Dressing Station in the Schoonoord Hotel of the Oosterbeek Perimeter.
Philip Raymond	Colonel McEwan	Edward H. Goulburn	C.O. 2nd Armoured Grenadier Guards Battalion.
Michael Caine	Lieutenant-Colonel J.O.E. Vandeleur	—N/a	CO, 3rd Battalion (Infantry), the Irish Guards, the Guards Armoured Division, XXX Corps, British Army
Anthony Hopkins	Lieutenant-Colonel John Frost	—N/a	Commanding Officer, 2nd Battalion The Parachute Regiment, 1st Parachute Brigade, 1st British Airborne Division at Arnhem road bridge
Michael Byrne	Lieutenant-Colonel Giles Vandeleur	—N/a	Acting CO, 2nd Battalion (Armoured), the Irish Guards, the British Guards Armoured Division. Cousin to 'Joe'.
Donald Pickering	Lieutenant-Colonel C.B. MacKenzie	—N/a	Principal General Staff Officer (Chief of Staff), Headquarters, 1st Airborne Division, British Army, Divisional HQ at the Hartenstein Hotel
Christopher Good	Major Harry Carlyle	Allison Digby Tatham-Warter	Officer Commanding, A Company, 2nd Battalion The Parachute Regiment, 1st Parachute Brigade, Arnhem.
Frank Grimes	Major Fuller	Brian Urquhart	G-2 (Intelligence Officer) for the 1st Airborne Corps, British Army stationed at the HQ located in Moor Park Golf Club, Hertfordshire, England.
Stephen Moore	Major Robert Steele	Anthony Deane–Drummond	Second–in–command of the divisional signals for 1st Airborne Division, later attached to 1st Parachute Brigade.
John Stride	Grenadier Guards Major	Captain Lord Carrington	British Grenadier Guards Commander who argues with Major Cook after 82nd capture Nijmegen Bridge.
Michael Graham Cox	Captain Jimmy Cleminson	—N/a	T/Capt., 5 Platoon, B Company, 3rd Battalion The Parachute Regiment, British Army, Arnhem
Keith Drinkel	Lieutenant Cornish	Eric MacKay	9th Parachute Squadron Royal Engineers, 1st Airborne Division.
Denholm Elliott	RAF Meteorology Officer	—N/a	
Jeremy Kemp	RAF Briefing Officer	—N/a	RAF, although the briefing probably took place at the 1st Airborne Corps HQ in Moor Park Golf Club, Hertfordshire, England
Mark Sheridan	Sergeant Tomblin	—N/a	2nd Battalion, 1st Parachute Brigade, 1st British Airborne Division
George Innes	Sergeant MacDonald	—N/a	British 1st Airborne Division radio operator at the Hartenstein Hotel
Alun Armstrong	Corporal Davies	—N/a	2nd Battalion The Parachute Regiment, 1st Parachute Brigade, 1st British Airborne Division
Paul Copley	Private Wicks	Dennis Wicks	Batman to Lieutenant Colonel Frost, CO, 2nd Battalion The Parachute Regiment, British Army
Ben Cross	Trooper Binns	—N/a	2nd Battalion, 1st Parachute Brigade, 1st British Airborne Division
David Auker	'Taffy' Brace	—N/a	Medic, 1st British Airborne Division

=== Americans ===
Actor	Role	Based on	Notes
Paul Maxwell	Major General Maxwell Taylor	—N/a	CG, 101st Airborne Division, US Army at the Son bridge and later St-Oedenrode
Ryan O'Neal	Brigadier General James Gavin	—N/a	Division Commander, US 82nd Airborne Division, US Army at the bridge across the River Maas in Grave, later at the Maas-Waal canal and the bridge across the River Waal in Nijmegen
Elliott Gould	Colonel Robert Stout	Robert Sink	CO, 506th Parachute Infantry Regiment, 101st Airborne Division.
Arthur Hill	US Army Surgeon Colonel	David Gold	Chief Division Surgeon, 101st Airborne Division Clearing Station.
Robert Redford	Major Julian Cook	—N/a	Commanding Officer, 3rd Battalion, 504th PIR, 82nd Airborne, US Army, seizing key bridges over the Maas-Waal Canal and the river assault crossing of the Waal.
Nicholas Campbell	Captain Glass	LeGrand King Johnson	CO, F Company, 2nd Battalion, 502PIR.
Garrick Hagon	Lieutenant Rafferty	—N/a	Lieutenant, 101st Military Police Platoon, 101st Airborne Division, Division Field Hospital, US Army
John Ratzenberger	Lieutenant Wall	1Lt. James Megellas	Lieutenant, Company H, 504th PIR, 82nd Airborne Division, US Army, at River Waal crossing.
James Caan	Staff Sergeant Eddie Dohun	Charles Dohun	First Sergeant of Company F, 2nd Battalion, 502nd Parachute Infantry Regiment, 101st Airborne Division U.S. Army (attacking Best).

=== Other Allies ===
Actor	Role	Notes
Gene Hackman	Major General Stanisław Sosabowski	Brigade Commander, Polish 1st Independent Parachute Brigade, Polish Armed Forces
Peter Faber	Captain Arie Bestebreurtje	Liaison officer with the 82nd Airborne Division, Office of Strategic Services, Royal Dutch Army (Note: He escaped in 1941 to the UK, was trained as an Office of Strategic Services agent, and assigned to operations behind enemy lines in occupied Holland.)
Siem Vroom	Dutch underground leader	
Erik van 't Wout	Underground leader's son	
Marlies van Alcmaer	Underground leader's wife	

=== Germans ===
Actor	Role	Based on	Notes
Wolfgang Preiss	Generalfeldmarschall Gerd von Rundstedt	—N/a	Commander, OB West
Walter Kohut	Generalfeldmarschall Walter Model	—N/a	Commander, Army Group B
Maximilian Schell	General der Waffen-SS Wilhelm Bittrich	—N/a	Corps Commander, II SS Panzer Corps.
Hans von Borsody	General der Infanterie Günther Blumentritt	—N/a	Chief of Staff, OB West
Hardy Krüger	Generalmajor der Waffen-SS Karl Ludwig	Heinz Harmel	Division Commander, 10th SS Panzer Division Frundsberg.
Fred Williams	SS-Hauptsturmführer Viktor Eberhard Gräbner	—N/a	Commander, reconnaissance battalion of the 9th SS Panzer Division Hohenstaufen
Lex van Delden	SS-Oberscharführer Matthias Boschmann	—N/a	Bittrich's orderly.
Hartmut Becker	German Army Feldgendarmerie sentry	—N/a	

=== Dutch civilians ===
Actor	Role	Notes
Laurence Olivier	Dr Jan Spaander	
Liv Ullmann	Kate ter Horst	
Mary Smithuysen	Old Dutch lady	
Hans Croiset	Old Dutch lady's son	
Josephine Peeper	Cafe waitress	
Tom van Beek	Jan ter Horst	
Erik Chitty	Organist	
Albert van der Harst	Medic	
Richard Attenborough	Lunatic wearing glasses	Uncredited cameo

== Production ==
Air filming was done in the first weeks of September 1976, culminating in a series of air drops of a total of 1,000 men. (Note: A member of the 1st Battalion The Parachute Regiment claims there were no more than 200 men involved. Parachute drops were conducted by the 1st Battalion The Parachute Regiment, only 100 jumpers plus support, 10 man sticks per Dakota.) Supplies were dropped from a number of Dakota aircraft. The Dakotas were gathered by the film company Joseph E. Levine Presents Incorporated. All aircraft were required to be CAA (Civil Aviation Authority) or FAA (Federal Aviation Administration) registered and licensed to carry passengers. An original deal for the purchase of 10 fell through when two airframes were rejected as passenger configured without the necessary jump doors.

Eleven Dakotas were procured. Two ex-Portuguese Air Force, 6153 and 6171 (N9984Q and N9983Q), and two from Air Djibouti, operating from Djibouti, F-OCKU and F-OCKX (N9985Q and N9986Q) were purchased by Joseph E. Levine. Three Danish Air Force K-685, K-687, and K-688, and four Finnish Air Force C-47s, DO-4, DO-7, DO-10 and DO-12, were loaned for the duration of the parachute filming.

Aircraft 6171 doubled as the camera ship on most formations, with a camouflaged Piper Aztec, G-AWDI. A camera was mounted in the astrodome, one on the port upper mainplane surface, with a third camera on the outside of the forward port cabin window and a fourth under the aircraft centre section. In addition, centre escape hatches were removed to make additional camera ports available, provided that no troops were aboard during filming. A second Aztec, G-ASND, was a backup camera ship on some shots, but it was not camouflaged. An Alouette, G-BDWN, was also employed. After a mishap with G-AWDI, two locally hired Cessna 172s, PH-GVP and PH-ADF, were also used. Ten Horsa glider replicas were built, but a windstorm damaged almost all of them. Seven or eight were hastily repaired for the shoot.

The replica gliders were tail-heavy and required a support post under the rear fuselage, with camera angles carefully chosen to avoid revealing this. Dakota 6153 was fitted with tow gear and Horsa replicas were towed at high speed, though none went airborne. A two-seat Blaník sailplane, provided by a member of the London Gliding Club, Dunstable, was towed aloft for the interior takeoff shots.

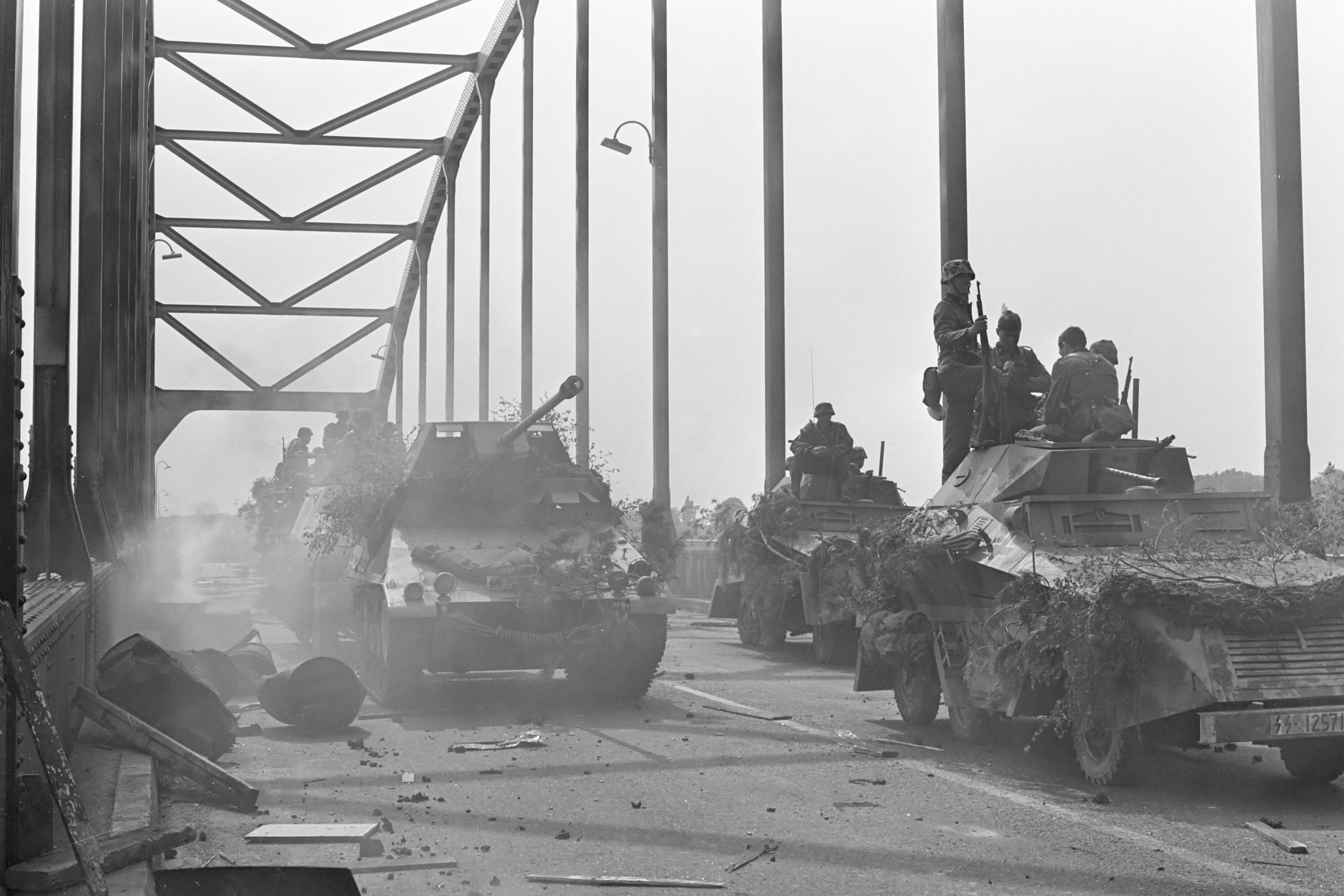
Shooting of a scene in Deventer on 18 May 1976. German vehicles are crossing the bridge.

Four Harvards portrayed American and German fighters. Their original identities were PH-KLU, PH-BKT, B-64 and B-118, the former two aircraft loaned by the Royal Netherlands Air Force. These were flown by members of the Gilze Rijen Aero Club, which also provided an Auster III, PH-NGK, which depicted an Auster V, RT607, in wartime camouflage. Spitfire Mk. IX, MH434, depicting a photo reconnaissance variant, coded AC-S, was lent by the Hon. Patrick Lindsay, and was flown by aerobatic champion Neil Williams.

Sufficient American tanks, jeeps, and trucks of World War II vintage were found because many of the vehicles were being discarded from European military (almost entirely reserve) units, especially from Greece and Turkey.

The scenes set around the Arnhem bridge were shot in Deventer, where a similar bridge over the IJssel was still available. Although a replica of the original road bridge in Arnhem existed, by the mid-1970s modern urban development surrounded it, making it impossible to use as a setting for a 1940s city. A few scenes were shot in Zutphen, where the old municipality house and the main church can be seen. Additional scenes were filmed at Twickenham Studios.

The Motion Picture Association of America initially gave the film an R rating for its use of the word "fuck" and depictions of war violence, but United Artists lobbied it to change it to a PG rating so that younger audiences could see the film. Cuts were also made to the film when released in the United Kingdom to avoid an AA rating from the British Board of Film Censors.

== Finance ==
To keep costs down, the star-name actors agreed to receive the same fee, of $250,000 per week (the 2012 equivalent of $1,008,250 or £642,000).

Shooting of the American-led assault on the Bridge at Nijmegen was dubbed the "Million-Dollar Hour". Because of heavy traffic, the crew had permission to film on the bridge only between eight and nine o'clock on 3 October 1976. Failure to complete the scene would have necessitated rescheduling at a cost—including Redford's overtime—of at least a million dollars. For this reason, Attenborough insisted that all actors playing corpses keep their eyes closed.

United Artists paid $6 million for US and Canada distribution rights, and the film became the sixth-most popular movie of 1977 US at the US box office.

== Reception ==
Critics were divided. Some thought the film was impressively staged and historically accurate, others found it too long and repetitive. On Rotten Tomatoes, 61% of 33 critics gave the film a positive review. Its critics consensus reads: "A Bridge Too Far is a war movie too long, although top-notch talent on both sides of the camera keeps the end result consistently watchable." According to Metacritic, the film received "generally favorable" reviews based on a weighted average score of 63 out of 100 from 13 critics.

Vincent Canby of The New York Times said further, "The movie is massive, shapeless, often unexpectedly moving, confusing, sad, vivid and very, very long." James Caan and Anthony Hopkins were cited by many critics for the excellence of their performances in a film with hundreds of speaking roles and cameos by many of the period's top actors. Generals Urquhart and Horrocks acted as military advisers to the film, adding to its historical accuracy. However, some reviewers suggested that the film contains historical inaccuracies and needs to be viewed as a 'Hollywood' interpretation of events. Robin Neillands commented, "A countless number of veterans have urged me to ignore most of the story in the film A Bridge Too Far".

Stanley Kauffmann of The New Republic wrote "A picture of conventional length on this subject might have scored some conventional ironies. But why did anyone think that a film about a failed WWII operation, without any novelty of information or deepening of history or even differently spectacular action, should run five minutes less than three hours? A Film Too Long".

Roger Ebert gave the film two out of four, describing it as

such an exercise in wretched excess, such a mindless series of routine scenes, such a boringly violent indulgence in all the blood and guts and moans they could find, that by the end we're prepared to speculate that maybe Levine went two or even three bridges too far. The movie's big and expensive and filled with stars, but it's not an epic. It's the longest B-grade war movie ever made.

Gene Siskel gave the film two-and-a-half out of four and wrote,

More often than not, A Bridge Too Far isn't a story; it's a parade of famous faces. As for the battle footage, it is more often tedious than glamorous. The paratroop landing provides a spectacular five minutes. Other action footage is routine.

John Pym of The Monthly Film Bulletin wrote that "by the end of this extravagant film, we have a fair idea of the who-did-what logistics of a costly military operation. The root problem with A Bridge Too Far, however, is that the top-heavy complement of stars never allows for any focus of attention." Charles Champlin of the Los Angeles Times wrote,

In strictly cinematic terms, the appeal of A Bridge Too Far is easy to state: it is spectacular in the size and range of its effects, earnestly well-acted by a starry and able cast, well-paced and swift despite its length, and marked by an evident attempt to give the balanced truth of a tragic episode from history.

Gary Arnold of The Washington Post called it "an unusually conscientious and impressive war epic" that justified its high budget...

in terms of careful period recreation, visual spectacle (the sequences depicting paratroop landings are particularly awesome), the mixture of exciting combat episodes with vivid human interest vignettes, an effort to establish a coherent, many-faceted view of a complicated and ill-fated military adventure, and a generally superior level of filmmaking intelligence and craftsmanship.

A "making-of" documentary included in a special edition DVD of A Bridge Too Far says that, at the time of its release, "the film was shunned by American critics and completely ignored at Oscar time for daring to expose the fatal inadequacies of the Allied campaign".

=== Accolades ===
Awards and nominations received by A Bridge Too Far
Award	Category	Nominee	Result
Evening Standard British Film Awards	Best Film	A Bridge Too Far	Won
31st British Academy Film Awards	Best Film	A Bridge Too Far	Nominated
31st British Academy Film Awards	Best Direction	Richard Attenborough	Nominated
31st British Academy Film Awards	Best Editing	Antony Gibbs	Nominated
31st British Academy Film Awards	Best Production Design	Terence Marsh	Nominated
31st British Academy Film Awards	Best Sound	Peter Horrocks, Gerry Humphreys, Simon Kaye, Robin O'Donoghue, and Les Wiggins	Won
31st British Academy Film Awards	Best Actor in a Supporting Role	Edward Fox	Won
31st British Academy Film Awards	Best Film Music	John Addison	Won
31st British Academy Film Awards	Best Cinematography	Geoffrey Unsworth	Won
1977 National Society of Film Critics Awards	Best Supporting Actor	Edward Fox	Won

== Promotion ==
Story of A Bridge Too Far
- Author: William Goldman
- Language: English
- Genre: non-fiction
- Publication date: 1977
- Publication place: United States

To promote the film, scriptwriter William Goldman wrote a book titled Story of A Bridge Too Far as a favour to Joseph E. Levine. It was published in December 1977 and divided into three sections:

1. "Reflections on Filmmaking in General and A Bridge Too Far". This section features some essays later reprinted in Goldman's Adventures in the Screen Trade.
2. "A Bridge Too Far: The Story in Pictures" – 150 sequential photographs from the film with Goldman's captions.
3. "Stars and Heroes" – some of the movie's actors and the men they play tell Goldman their thoughts on the film and the battle.
