= Entertainment during the Great Depression =

During the 1930s, the United States was facing its longest and deepest economic downturn, the Great Depression. Spending money on entertainment was out of the question for most people. Radio shows, Hollywood films, music, and sports were some forms of entertainment that were affordable ways to escape the struggle and boost morale during this time period of economic hardship. This entertainment helped Americans imagine themselves as one unified national community, rather than segregated ethnic sections of society.

== Movies ==
The movie industry took a hit due to the depression as well, however this time period was also seen as the beginning to Hollywood's "Golden Age." With new technological innovations like the introduction of sound in films with the release of The Jazz Singer in 1927, major film studios like Warner Bros., Paramount, and MGM began to have major success in the film industry. At the beginning of the depression, box office sales declined causing a shift from luxury movie palaces to neighborhood theaters allowing for an affordable form of entertainment. Many classic films were created during this time, including, Frankenstein, 42nd Street, King Kong, Snow White and the Seven Dwarfs, The Wizard of Oz, Mr. Smith Goes to Washington, Gone With the Wind, and Three Little Pigs. Many of these films, like Snow White and the Seven Dwarfs, reflected cultural themes of hope and resilience as characters overcome hardships and attain moral victory. In the 1934 Hollywood musical named Stand Up and Cheer!, the President of the United States creates a Department of Amusement to boost morale during the depression. Lawrence Cromwell, the actor of the secretary of this department, creates an army of entertainers to go around the world and perform musical and comedy numbers, using music and art to uplift spirits. Stand Up and Cheer! highlights the connection between the morale boosting efforts of art with music and comedy at the time, and the efforts of the Roosevelt Administration with the New Deal.

== Music ==
Music was another form of entertainment affected by the Great Depression that was very popular for Americans at the time. With the radio, music was accessible to many families. Radio shows and live broadcasts would bring bands and singers to families homes through the radio. During the 1930s, big band jazz and swing gained a lot of attention within the music industry. Big band leaders like Duke Ellington, Benny Goodman, and Glenn Miller brought upbeat and danceable jazz and swing to America creating a sense of community behind these genres. The genre of Jazz underwent the "Folk Process" at the time, transitioning to a genre influenced by the economic hardship and social issues at the time. This created an inclusive community built around resilience and hope, boosting morale during the Great Depression. One producer during this time, John Hammond, challenged the racial marketing bias within the music industry. As the American Record Industry heavily decreased in record sales, Hammond thrived by signing talents with extraordinary and iconoclastic styles. This added to the developments of jazz, blues, and other genres due to racial integration, helping build community around music during this time. At the end of prohibition in 1933, clubs and "speakeasies" became popular places for live music and dancing during the depression as the consumption of alcohol became legal again. After this, the technological advancement of coin-operated music machines, or the "Jukebox," became a massive affordable form of entertainment. This was the beginning of people being able to choose songs from different records, allowing the record industry to increase sales stocking jukeboxes and collect data polling popular music taste.

== Radio ==
Listening to radio broadcasting became a source of nearly free entertainment. Radio stations had programming for all ages. One of the most common radio shows for young children was Little Orphan Annie. The show is about an adventurous young girl who had an equally adventurous dog named Sandy. Together, Annie and Sandy would try to solve mysteries. Children purchased merchandise such as pins of Annie. Later, a film was released. Adults listened to newscasts, radio theater, the Grand Ole Opry, soap operas, and sermons as well.

== Board games ==
The board game Monopoly, published by the Parker Brothers in 1935, was a popular favorite. Many people enjoyed it because they liked to "play" being rich. It cost $1 during the time. With calculation of inflation, that would be $15.45 in 2020. Another popular game was Sorry!, which was adopted by the Parker Brothers in 1934. Scrabble was also a popular board game during the Great Depression.

== Comics ==
The Superman character made his first appearance in Action Comics in April, 1938. The creation of Joe Shuster and Jerry Siegel and published by Detective Comics (DC), its popularity led to a surge in interest in the comic book genre.
