= Terence Young (director) =

British film director and screenwriter (1915–1994)

- Born: Stewart Terence Herbert Young; 20 June 1915; Shanghai International Settlement, China
- Died: 7 September 1994 (aged 79); Cannes, France
- Other name: Shaun Terence Young
- Education: St Catharine's College, Cambridge
- Occupations: Film director, screenwriter
- Spouse: Dorothea Bennett (m. 1942)
- Children: 3

Stewart Terence Herbert Young (20 June 1915 – 7 September 1994) was a British film director and screenwriter who worked in the United Kingdom, Europe and Hollywood. He is best known for directing three James Bond films: the first two films in the series, Dr. No (1962) and From Russia with Love (1963), and Thunderball (1965). His other films include the Audrey Hepburn thrillers Wait Until Dark (1967) and Bloodline (1979), the historical drama Mayerling (1968), the infamous Korean War epic Inchon (1981), and the Charles Bronson films Cold Sweat (1970), Red Sun (1971), and The Valachi Papers (1972).

== Early life and education ==
Young was born in the International Settlement, of Shanghai, China, to British parents, His civil registration documents gives his name as Stewart Terence Herbert Young, though he also used the name Shaun Terence Young, and is listed as such by the British Film Institute's Screenonline database.

Young’s father was a deputy commissioner of the Shanghai Municipal Police. His family moved back to England when he was a child, and he was educated at Harrow School in London. He read history at St Catharine's College, Cambridge. During the Second World War Young rose to the rank of captain in the British Army, and as intelligence officer of the Guards Armoured Division, Young was wounded in Operation Market Garden in the Netherlands in 1944.

== Career ==
=== Screenwriter ===
Young wrote film reviews for Granta and worked at Elstree Studios during his summer vacation. He broke into the industry as a screenwriter, earning a credit for Brian Desmond Hurst's On the Night of the Fire (1939), which was chosen as Britain's entry for the Cannes Film Festival. He wrote further scripts for Hurst: A Call for Arms (1940) (a short), Dangerous Moonlight (1941), and A Letter from Ulster (1942) (a short).

For other directors Young wrote Secret Mission (1942) (featuring a young James Mason) and On Approval (1944).

Young went off to war service. In 1946, he returned to assist Hurst again with the script of Theirs Is the Glory, which told the story of the fighting around Arnhem Bridge. Arnhem, coincidentally, was home to an adolescent Audrey Hepburn. During the later filming of Young's film Wait Until Dark, Hepburn and Young joked that he had been shelling his favourite star without even knowing it.

Young worked at Two Cities Films on the screenplays for Hurst's Hungry Hill (1947) and David McDonald's The Bad Lord Byron (1949). These films were expensive box office failures.

=== Director ===
Young's first sole credit as director (and also Christopher Lee's film debut) was Corridor of Mirrors (1948), an acclaimed film made in France starring Eric Portman.

He followed it with a musical One Night with You (1948), shot in Italy. This was highly unsuccessful at the box office. In England Young was to direct Precious Bane with Stewart Granger but that was cancelled and instead he made Woman Hater (1948), a comedy with the actor. Young wrote and directed They Were Not Divided (1950), a war movie set in the Battle of Arnhem, in which Young had participated. It was Young's first hit as director.

Young directed Valley of Eagles (1951), a spy film on which he was credited on the script, which was partly shot in Sweden. He followed this with The Tall Headlines (1952).

=== Warwick Films ===
Young then made the first film for Irving Allen and Albert R. Broccoli's Warwick Films, The Red Beret starring Alan Ladd. This movie was a notable success at the British box office and featured many crew who would later be significant on the Bond films - not just Allen, Broccoli and Young but also writer Richard Maibaum, camera operator Ted Moore and stuntman Bob Simmons.

Young made That Lady (1955) in Spain with Olivia de Havilland, which was the first film of Paul Scofield, although it was not a commercial success. Young worked for Alex Korda on Storm Over the Nile (1955), an essentially shot-for-shot remake of the 1939 film The Four Feathers. This was popular at the British box office.

Warwick asked Young back to do Safari (1956), a movie about the Mau Mau shot partly on location in Kenya, with Victor Mature and Janet Leigh. For the same company, Young directed Zarak (1957), also with Mature and Anita Ekberg. This was a big hit.

MGM hired Young to make Action of the Tiger (1957) with Van Johnson; a young Sean Connery had a supporting role. No Time to Die (1958), a war story set in North Africa, was Young's fourth film for Warwick, and third with Mature. Young was credited on the screenplay. He directed an episode of Playhouse 90 called "Dark as the Night" from a novel by James Hadley Chase; it was shot in London.

Young made Serious Charge (1959), which was Cliff Richard's film debut. Then he did Too Hot to Handle (1960) with Jayne Mansfield. Young went to Europe to make Black Tights (1961) in France, a ballet film, with Maurice Chevalier and Duel of Champions (1961), a sword-and-sandal film shot in Italy and Yugoslavia with Alan Ladd.

=== James Bond ===
Albert Broccoli and Irving Allen had split as a producing team, and Broccoli went into partnership with Harry Saltzman to make a series of films based on the James Bond novels. Broccoli used many of the crew he had worked with during his time at Warwick for the first Bond movies, including Young as director, on Dr. No (1962). According to Bond historian, Steve Jay Rubin, "Tall, well-dressed and exquisitely mannered, Terence Young had all the panache of Ian Fleming’s James Bond. He was also an avid reader of the novels and was in favour of retaining as much of Fleming’s writing for the film version of Dr. No as possible."

Young made several key contributions to the film including recruiting Sean Connery to portray Bond. Actress Lois Maxwell, who portrayed Miss Moneypenny, later said that "Terence took Sean under his wing. He took him to dinner, to his tailor, showed him how to walk, how to talk, even how to eat."

The movie was a huge box office success and was quickly followed by From Russia with Love (1963), an even bigger hit. During the filming, Young and a photographer nearly drowned when their helicopter crashed into the sea while filming a key sequence. They were rescued by other members of the film crew. Young was back behind the camera 30 minutes after being rescued.

Young was deluged with offers. He started preproduction on Goldfinger but wanted a percentage of the profits and the producers refused. Young quit the film, being replaced by Guy Hamilton. Instead he made The Amorous Adventures of Moll Flanders (1965). This film was a co-production with Young's Winchester Productions and starred Kim Novak (at one stage it was going to star Connery's then-wife Diane Cilento).

Young returned for Thunderball (1965), the fourth Bond movie. This turned out to be Young's last Bond. According to Young, he was offered and turned down the direction of Bond films For Your Eyes Only and Never Say Never Again.

=== European films ===
Following Thunderball, most of Young's work was in continental Europe, mainly Italy and France. Young directed part of the 1965 espionage portmanteau film The Dirty Game starring Bourvil and Henry Fonda. He provided the story for a spy film starring Frederick Stafford, Atout cœur à Tokyo pour OSS 117 (1966), and directed the all-star The Poppy Is Also a Flower (1966), from a story by Ian Fleming.

Young followed this with Triple Cross (1966), a war spy story starring Christopher Plummer and Yul Brynner.

He made The Rover (1967) with Anthony Quinn which was a huge box office flop. Young had a hit with Wait Until Dark with Audrey Hepburn. In a 1967 interview he said his three best films were Black Tights, From Russia with Love and They Were Not Divided. Wait Until Dark was very popular.

Young directed and co-wrote Mayerling (1968) with Omar Sharif and The Christmas Tree (1969) with William Holden.

Young made three films starring Charles Bronson. The first was the thriller Cold Sweat (1970). Then came the offbeat Western Red Sun (1972) co starring Ursula Andress from Dr No, Alain Delon and Toshiro Mifune; this was popular internationally. Their last collaboration was the biographical mob drama The Valachi Papers (1972), another hit.

=== Later films ===
Young made War Goddess (1973), then was hired to direct The Klansman (1974) with Richard Burton and Lee Marvin. The latter was based on a script by Samuel Fuller who was meant to direct, but Young was hired at the insistence of the film's European investors, who also arranged for the script to be rewritten. Young arranged for the casting of Luciana Paluzzi, who had been in Thunderball. Fuller later met Young on a film festival jury, and wrote in his memoirs:

Terence swore he'd never meant to squeeze me out of the picture. He'd never even read my original script and couldn't have cared less about America's social problems. His manager had pushed him to accept the job purely for the paycheck. Terence had big expenses to keep up on his estate on the Cote d'Azur and an expensive French girlfriend. He knew he'd made a lousy picture. How could I begrudge such an honest guy who freely admitted his greed.

Young went to work on Jackpot with the same actor, producer and writer as The Klansman. However the film was never finished due to financial issues.

Young directed Hepburn again in Bloodline (1979) from a novel by Sidney Sheldon, replacing John Frankenheimer.

He went to Korea to make Inchon (1981) about the Battle of Inchon with Laurence Olivier. Olivier and Young had been friends since 1943 when Olivier had initially offered the direction of his film Henry V (1944) to Young, who declined. At the 3rd Golden Raspberry Awards in 1983, he won the Razzie Award for Worst Director for Inchon.

Later on Young made The Jigsaw Man (1983) with Michael Caine and Olivier. Filming was difficult as it ran out of money and had to stop until more finance could be secured.

Young's last film as director was Run for Your Life (1988) with David Carradine. Young contributed to the screenplay for the Hong Kong film Foxbat (1977), which led to him being credited as co-director in some regions. Young was the editor of The Long Days (Al-ayyam al-tawila) (1980), a six-hour Iraqi telenovela about the life of Saddam Hussein, which also led to him being credited as co-director in some regions.

=== Critical reputation ===
Screenonline wrote "Young remained a chameleon working without a definable identity within the confines of mainstream commercial production and the uninspired quality of much of his output suggests a director who wasn't really trying; but after his lucrative encounters with Mr Bond perhaps he didn't need to."

In 1968 Andrew Sarris wrote Young "did the best of the Bonds, Wait Until Dark, and the curiously memorable, baroque, and unoriginal Corridor of Mirrors. He seems at home with the sweet lyricism of death, but his overall career is staggeringly undistinguished. Nonetheless, he seems to have come into his own, at least commercially."

== Personal life ==
Young married the novelist Dorothea "Dosia" Bennett in 1942. Bennett had been married to a Norwegian man by the name of Nissen, with whom she had had a daughter, but had had her marriage to him dissolved by the Norwegian government-in-exile in London in June 1942 and married Young five days later. Nissen later sued for divorce from Bennett alleging that the dissolution by the Norwegian government-in-exile had been invalid, and citing Young as the respondent. Nissen's suit was upheld at first instance in March 1955 before being over-turned on appeal later the same year, with the original dissolution being found valid.

He had a son and two daughters with Bennett, their son being born in March 1943. Juliet Nissen, Bennett's daughter by her previous marriage, was raised as Young's step-daughter. Bennett and Young's youngest child was a three-week-old girl they adopted in 1966 when their first two children were already adults. Young died of a heart attack in Cannes, France at the age of 79.

=== Sexual misconduct allegation ===
In 2022, Jamaican actress Marguerite LeWars claimed that Young sexually assaulted her in 1962. According to an interview with LeWars, the incident occurred while the two were in a limousine on their way to a wrap party for Dr. No. Young repeatedly propositioned LeWars and, when she refused, groped her. After LeWars rejected his advances, Young threatened to cut her scenes out of Dr. No. Two months later, Young telephoned LeWars at her home in Kingston and propositioned her again, asking her to fly out to London to dub her lines. When she refused, he again threatened to cut her from the film. LeWars stated this was the real reason for her voice having been dubbed over by another actress.

== Filmography ==
- 1948: Corridor of Mirrors
- 1948: One Night with You
- 1948: Woman Hater
- 1950: They Were Not Divided
- 1951: Valley of Eagles
- 1952: The Tall Headlines
- 1953: The Red Beret
- 1955: That Lady
- 1955: Storm Over the Nile
- 1956: Safari
- 1956: Zarak
- 1957: Action of the Tiger
- 1958: No Time to Die
- 1959: Serious Charge
- 1960: Too Hot to Handle
- 1961: Black Tights
- 1961: Duel of Champions
- 1962: Dr. No
- 1963: From Russia with Love
- 1965: The Amorous Adventures of Moll Flanders
- 1965: The Dirty Game
- 1965: Thunderball
- 1966: The Poppy Is Also a Flower
- 1966: Triple Cross
- 1967: The Rover
- 1967: Wait Until Dark
- 1968: Mayerling
- 1969: The Christmas Tree
- 1970: Cold Sweat
- 1971: Red Sun
- 1972: The Valachi Papers
- 1973: War Goddess
- 1974: The Klansman
- 1977: Foxbat
- 1979: Bloodline
- 1981: Inchon
- 1984: The Jigsaw Man
- 1988: Run for Your Life
