= Der Marsch zum Führer =

1935 film

- Starring: Rudolf Hess; Adolf Hitler; Baldur von Schirach
- Release date: 1940
- Running time: 48 minutes
- Country: Nazi Germany
- Language: German

Der Marsch zum Führer (English: The March to the Führer) is a 48-minute Nazi propaganda film released in 1940. It follows the 1938 march of Hitler Youth (HJ) from various parts of Germany to Nuremberg for the Nazi Party Congress, culminating in their parade past Hitler and Reich youth leader Baldur von Schirach.

At the rally, von Schirach announces that 52,800 Hitler Youth and 5,000 League of German Girls have assembled in the stadium to hear Hitler's message. The film concludes at the Landsberg prison where Hitler was incarcerated in 1924.

A total of 40,000 metres of film footage was shot for the film, including idyllic scenes from all over Germany where the Hitler Youth begin their journeys – carrying their flags from the island of Rügen, from farmland in the Lüneburg Heath, from the Golzheim Heath near Düsseldorf, and from the Bavarian Forest.
