= United Nations television film series =

Television series

The United Nations television film series was a series of American television films planned and developed in the 1960s for the purpose of promoting the United Nations (UN) and educating television viewers about its work. Although six films were originally planned, only four were broadcast, all by the American Broadcasting Company (ABC) network between December 1964 and April 1966.

The series was funded by corporate sponsor Xerox and involved many notable producers, directors, writers, and actors, including Joseph Mankiewicz, Paul Heller, Leopoldo Torre Nilsson, Terence Young, Rod Serling, Ian Fleming, Peter Sellers, Theodore Bikel, Edward G. Robinson, Alan Bates, Melvyn Douglas, Yul Brynner, Omar Sharif, Eli Wallach, Marcello Mastroianni, Rita Hayworth, and Princess Grace of Monaco.

== Conception and planning ==
The idea for a series of television specials was inspired by an October 1963 incident in Dallas, Texas (a few weeks prior to the assassination of John F. Kennedy in Dallas) in which UN ambassador Adlai Stevenson II was physically assaulted by anti-UN protesters outside Dallas Memorial Auditorium after delivering a "UN Day" speech. At the time, American popular support for the UN, while still generally high, was beginning to drop slightly, and some conservative Republicans, including the 1964 Republican presidential candidate Barry Goldwater, favored limiting U.S. involvement with the UN. Paul G. Hoffman, then the director of the UN Special Fund, believed that educating the American public about the work of the UN through television dramas would increase popular support for the organization.

Hoffman contacted his friend, public relations executive Edgar Rosenberg, and the two men and others formed the nonprofit Telsun Foundation ("Telsun" being an acronym for "Television Series for the United Nations") to develop the television film series. Ideas for the films came from the UN's own files. The office equipment company Xerox, then led by Joseph C. Wilson, agreed to donate $4 million in funding, in keeping with Xerox's public relations strategy to purchase programs relating to timely, controversial news topics that "get talked about". The original plan envisioned six television specials — essentially made-for-TV movies, although that term did not come into use until October 1964 — with the Xerox grant covering the costs of both production and air time so that each program could be televised without commercial interruption. Later, the number of planned programs was reduced to five due to higher than anticipated costs, and only four were actually broadcast.

In order to produce high-quality films without exceeding the amount of the Xerox grant, Telsun sought to have well-known producers, directors, writers and actors work for free, or for very small fees such as one dollar or union scale. Early publicity listed filmmakers Peter Glenville, Alfred Hitchcock, Stanley Kubrick, Joseph Mankiewicz, Otto Preminger, Robert Rossen, George Sidney, Sam Spiegel, Terence Young, and Fred Zinnemann as being involved with the project. Of those named, only Mankiewicz, Sidney and Young completed films for broadcast, while Spiegel produced a partial film that was never completed. According to Edgar Rosenberg and screenwriter Rod Serling, Telsun had trouble getting actors to commit to the films due to conflicts, presumably with more lucrative work. Some notable exceptions included Peter Sellers, who, seeking a small project after his near-fatal heart attack, appeared in A Carol for Another Christmas for the $350 Screen Actors Guild minimum instead of his usual $750,000 fee; Sterling Hayden, who turned down a competing $50,000 offer in order to appear in Carol at $350 per week; and Eli Wallach, who happened to be in the area where The Poppy Is Also a Flower was being filmed, and agreed to appear in return for six dress shirts.

Telsun planned to have each of the three major U.S. networks at that time — American Broadcasting Company (ABC), National Broadcasting Company (NBC), and Columbia Broadcasting System (CBS) — broadcast two programs. (CBS claimed that Telsun had originally approached it to broadcast all six programs.) However, CBS withdrew from the project, citing concerns that the programs' expected pro-UN stance would constitute a political position, forcing the network to give equal air time to opponents of the UN. NBC in turn imposed restrictions on program content, required that the programs go through a network approval process, and wanted to delay Telsun's planned broadcast date. Consequently, the four programs that aired were all broadcast on ABC.

== Individual films broadcast in the series ==
The individual films that were broadcast on ABC as part of the series are listed below.

Original air date	Title	Producer	Director	Writer	Featured actors
December 28, 1964	A Carol for Another Christmas	Joseph L. Mankiewicz	Joseph L. Mankiewicz	Rod Serling	Sterling Hayden, Ben Gazzara, Peter Sellers, Percy Rodriguez, Steve Lawrence, Pat Hingle, Robert Shaw
In this updated version of Charles Dickens' A Christmas Carol, a rich, embittered American industrialist meets three ghosts on Christmas Eve, who show him the importance of global cooperation.
February 19, 1965	Who Has Seen the Wind? (working title: The Land Bird)	George Sidney	George Sidney	Tad Mosel (story), Don Mankiewicz	Theodore Bikel, Maria Schell, Veronica Cartwright, Stanley Baker, Edward G. Robinson, Victor Jory, Gypsy Rose Lee
A displaced refugee family is forced to live for years on a tramp steamer because no country will give them asylum. Costumes for the film were designed by Edith Head.
September 9, 1965	Once Upon a Tractor	Paul Heller	Leopoldo Torre Nilsson	Arthur A. Ross	Alan Bates, Diane Cilento, Melvyn Douglas, Albert Dekker, Buddy Hackett, Clive Revill
A farmer who has failed to receive a requested tractor from his local government authority travels halfway around the world to New York City to ask the UN to intervene.
April 22, 1966	The Poppy Is Also a Flower (alternate titles include Poppies Are Also Flowers, The Opium Connection and Danger Grows Wild)	Euan Lloyd	Terence Young	Ian Fleming (story), Jo Eisinger	E.G. Marshall, Trevor Howard, Yul Brynner, Angie Dickinson, Harold Sakata, Omar Sharif, Marcello Mastroianni, Eli Wallach, Rita Hayworth, with an introduction by Princess Grace of Monaco
UN narcotics agents track a shipment of opium from the Afghanistan–Iran border to Europe in search of a major heroin distributor. The story by Fleming was believed to be the last story he wrote before his death. The original 80-minute version broadcast on television was later expanded to 100 minutes for theatrical release.

== Unfinished fifth film ==
Production was started on a fifth film entitled The Kashmir Story, produced by Sam Spiegel and written by Nunnally Johnson, focusing on UN peacekeeping efforts along the India-Pakistan border. However, during 1965, production was repeatedly postponed due to armed conflict between the two countries regarding the status of disputed Kashmir territory. By the end of 1965, Spiegel had moved on to other projects and production was never resumed.

== Reception ==
=== Political controversy ===
In July 1964, after the upcoming series had been publicized but before any programs had aired, the right-wing John Birch Society launched a letter-writing campaign aimed at sponsor Xerox with the goal of suppressing the series. In the Society's bulletin, its national director of public information, John Rousselot, called for a "flood of 50,000 to 100,000 letters of protest". This was in keeping with the Society's past record of protest against the UN, including a 1959 "Get US Out of UN" campaign. Rousselot explained, "We hate to see a corporation of this country promote the U.N. when we know it is an instrument of the Soviet Communist conspiracy."

The Society later claimed that 51,000 letters of protest from 13,000 people were sent to Xerox, although Xerox claimed that only 29,000 letters from 6,000 people had been received, and further claimed that it had also received 6,000 letters in support of the series. A November 1965 Saturday Review article gave the total number of protest letters sent to Xerox as 61,000 letters written by 16,000 distinct individuals, and the total number of letters in support as 14,500, all written by distinct individuals. Saturday Review also cited a Roper poll conducted after the first two programs showing that approximately three out of four adult Americans who were aware of the UN series generally supported its broadcast.

Although the John Birch Society was unsuccessful in suppressing the series entirely, CBS recognized that "there is, whether we like it or not, a substantial segment of the American population which is opposed to the U.N." Based on a UN representative's statement that the programs would show the UN "in some favorable way", CBS refused to broadcast any of the programs because they "would violate the CBS policy that a drama must not 'serve as a political tract or as propaganda for a particular viewpoint.'" CBS was concerned that groups opposed to the UN might demand equal network time. NBC also voiced concerns about the programs' content, mandating that all programs must be pre-approved by NBC and "must not contain material soliciting funds or appealing for support of the United Nations". NBC ultimately did not broadcast any of the programs.

Some Xerox stockholders objected on political as well as cost grounds to the company's sponsorship of the series. ABC and other media outlets such as The New York Times and TV Guide also received letters opposing or supporting the series on political grounds.

=== Critics' response ===
The four films that aired received mixed reviews. For the first two films, some critics praised the productions, while others felt that the theme of support for the UN was presented in a heavy-handed, moralistic manner that detracted from the dramatic value. New York Times critic Jack Gould wrote a sharply negative review of the series premiere A Carol for Another Christmas, sparking debate among critics and readers about whether the series' intentions to promote world peace and humanitarianism deserved more respect, and whether an "obvious" approach to delivering the message was the most effective way for television to reach viewers. The second film, Who Has Seen the Wind?, was considered a "soap opera" by some critics, with Gould calling it "Peyton Place on a raft".

By the third film, the screwball comedy Once Upon a Tractor, the promotional information about the UN had been made more subtle, causing at least one critic to complain that this approach was less likely than the previous polemical style to convert viewers opposed to the UN. Tractor was also criticized for having a weak and unbelievable script.

The fourth and final film, the anti-narcotics law enforcement thriller The Poppy Is Also a Flower, was directed by Terence Young, who had previously directed several James Bond films and re-used some Bond film elements in Poppy. Following its television broadcast, 20 additional minutes of film were added and it was released to theaters in Europe and the United States, with the proceeds given to UNICEF. In its television form, Poppy received good reviews from UPI television critic Rick DuBrow and Variety, but was criticized by others as heavy-handed, stereotypical, and "a very long, confusing bore". Its theatrical release version was severely panned by Time as "another James Bond movie filmed without James Bond, and many will wish it had been filmed without film". Time further noted that the film was developed "from an idea proposed by author Ian Fleming, who mercifully died before he could see what happened to it." More recently, Robert von Dassanowsky called the film an "international pseudoepic" with "grandiose pretensions" and opined that its "heavy-handed propaganda slant" kept it from achieving the cult status attained by other 1960s spy films. Leonard Maltin's Movie Guide deemed it an "[i]ncredibly bad anti-drug feature", saying that its "[a]cting is downright poor at times."

Despite negative critical response, three of the four films received Emmy Award nominations, resulting in one win by Eli Wallach for "Outstanding Performance by an Actor in a Supporting Role in a Drama" in The Poppy Is Also a Flower.

In a December 1965 New York Times article discussing the postponement of the planned fifth film due to hostilities in the filming location, Val Adams observed, "Some professional television critics, writing sympathetically of the purpose behind the series, said that theatrically it was dogged by misfortune."

=== Audience response ===
A Roper poll taken after the first two films were broadcast found that approximately one in five adult Americans had watched at least part of one film. However, following the broadcast of the first three films, an Associated Press story stated that the series so far had "attracted neither the big audiences nor the critical acclaim that had been anticipated".

== Other films associated with the series ==
According to TV historian Mitchell Hadley, Telsun also owned the U.S. distribution rights to Torre Nilsson's 1967 Argentine drama film Monday's Child (also known as La chica del lunes), starring Arthur Kennedy and Geraldine Page. The film tells the story of an American family working on a flood relief effort in Puerto Rico who go searching for the daughter's doll that was donated to refugees. Hadley has suggested that this film might have been originally planned as part of the UN series.

The 1965 documentary film Let My People Go: The Story of Israel, also funded by Xerox, was sometimes mentioned as being part of the UN series. However, unlike the other films, Let My People Go was not produced by Telsun, but rather by Wolper Productions, and was a documentary rather than a dramatic film.

== See also ==
- United Nations
- United Nations in popular culture
- List of television films produced for American Broadcasting Company (ABC)
