= Britt Ekland =

Swedish actress (born 1942)

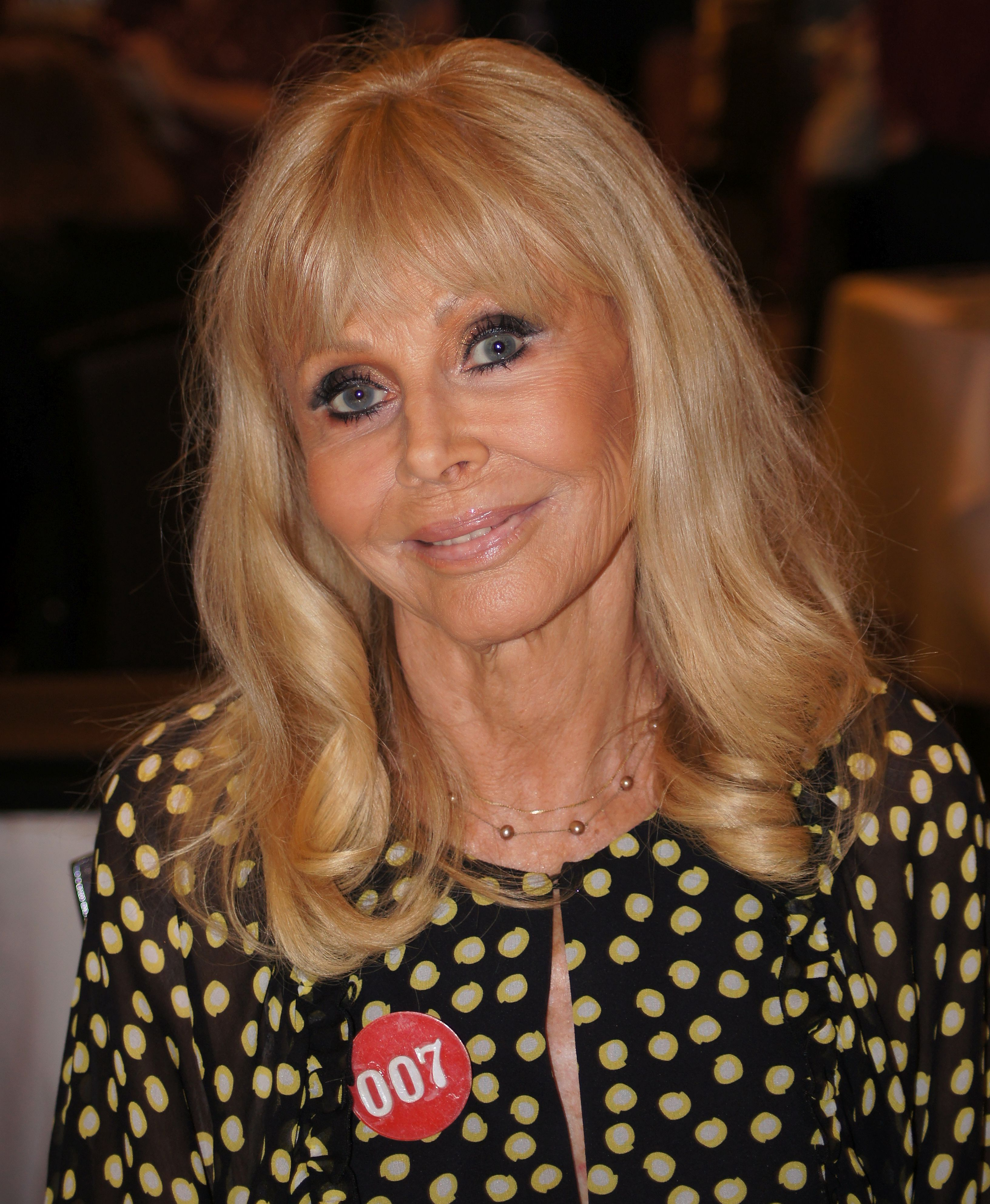
- Ekland in 2019
- Born: Britt-Marie Eklund; 6 October 1942 (age 84); Stockholm, Sweden
- Occupation: Actress
- Years active: 1959–present
- Spouses: Peter Sellers (m. 1964; div. 1968) Slim Jim Phantom (m. 1984; div. 1992)
- Partners: Lou Adler (1972–1974); Rod Stewart (1975–1977); Phil Lewis (1979–1981)
- Children: 3, including Victoria
- Parent: Sven Eklund (father)

Britt Ekland (born Britt-Marie Eklund; 6 October 1942) is a Swedish actress. She appeared in numerous films throughout the 1960s and 1970s, including roles in The Double Man (1967), The Night They Raided Minsky's (1968), Machine Gun McCain (1969), Stiletto (1969), and the British crime film Get Carter (1971), which established her as a sex symbol. She also starred in several horror films, including The Wicker Man (1973), and she appeared as the primary Bond girl in The Man with the Golden Gun (1974).

Ekland continued to act throughout the 1970s, with roles in films such as The Ultimate Thrill (1974), Royal Flash (1975), High Velocity (1976), and King Solomon's Treasure (1979), and into the 1980s, starring in the likes of Fraternity Vacation (1985), Moon in Scorpio (1987), and Scandal (1989). Since the early 1990s her acting work has mainly consisted of stage shows, one-off roles, cameos, and appearances on reality television.

Her high-profile social life, her 1964 marriage to actor Peter Sellers, and her relationship with singer Rod Stewart attracted considerable press attention, making her one of the world's most photographed celebrities during the 1970s.

== Early life ==
Ekland was born Britt-Marie Eklund in Stockholm, Sweden to Sven Eklund and Maj Britt, a secretary. Her father ran an upmarket clothing store in Stockholm and was captain of the Swedish national curling team, four-time national champion, and one-time president of the World Curling Federation. Ekland's mother died of Alzheimer's disease in the 1980s, which had a profound effect on her.

Ekland grew up with three younger brothers, and has said that she was overweight for much of her childhood: "I was very heavy. God, I was brutal-looking. I always tried to be funny to make up for the fact that I was fat and ugly". As a teenager, Ekland left school to travel with a theatre company and was spotted in a coffee shop in Italy by a talent agent who sent her to London to audition for films.

== Career ==
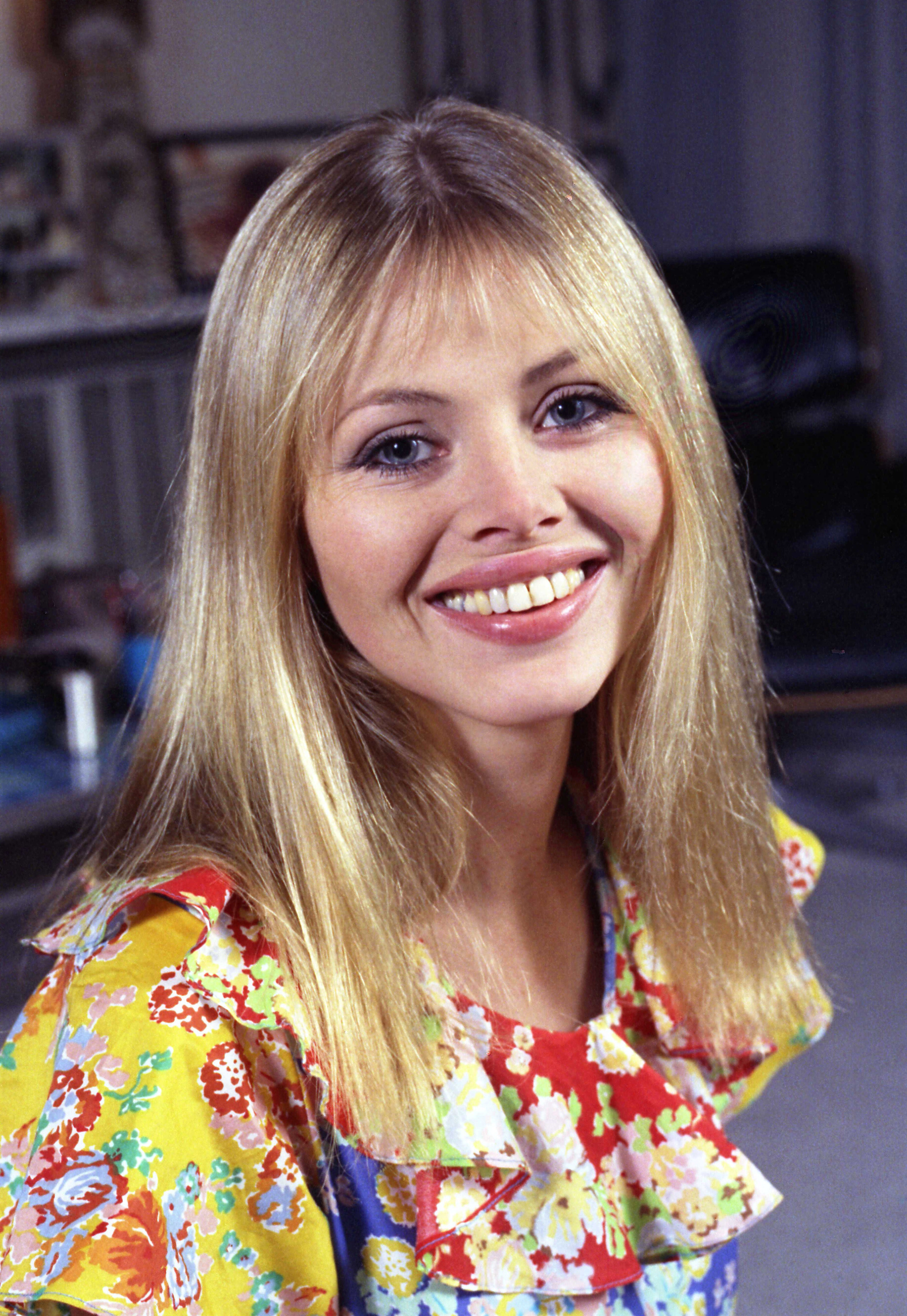
Ekland in 1972

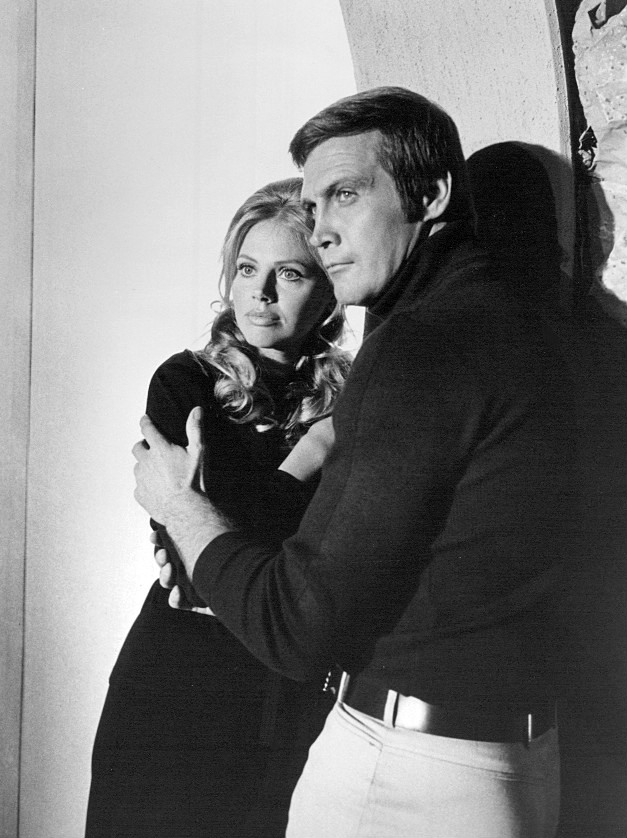
With Lee Majors in The Six Million Dollar Man (1973)

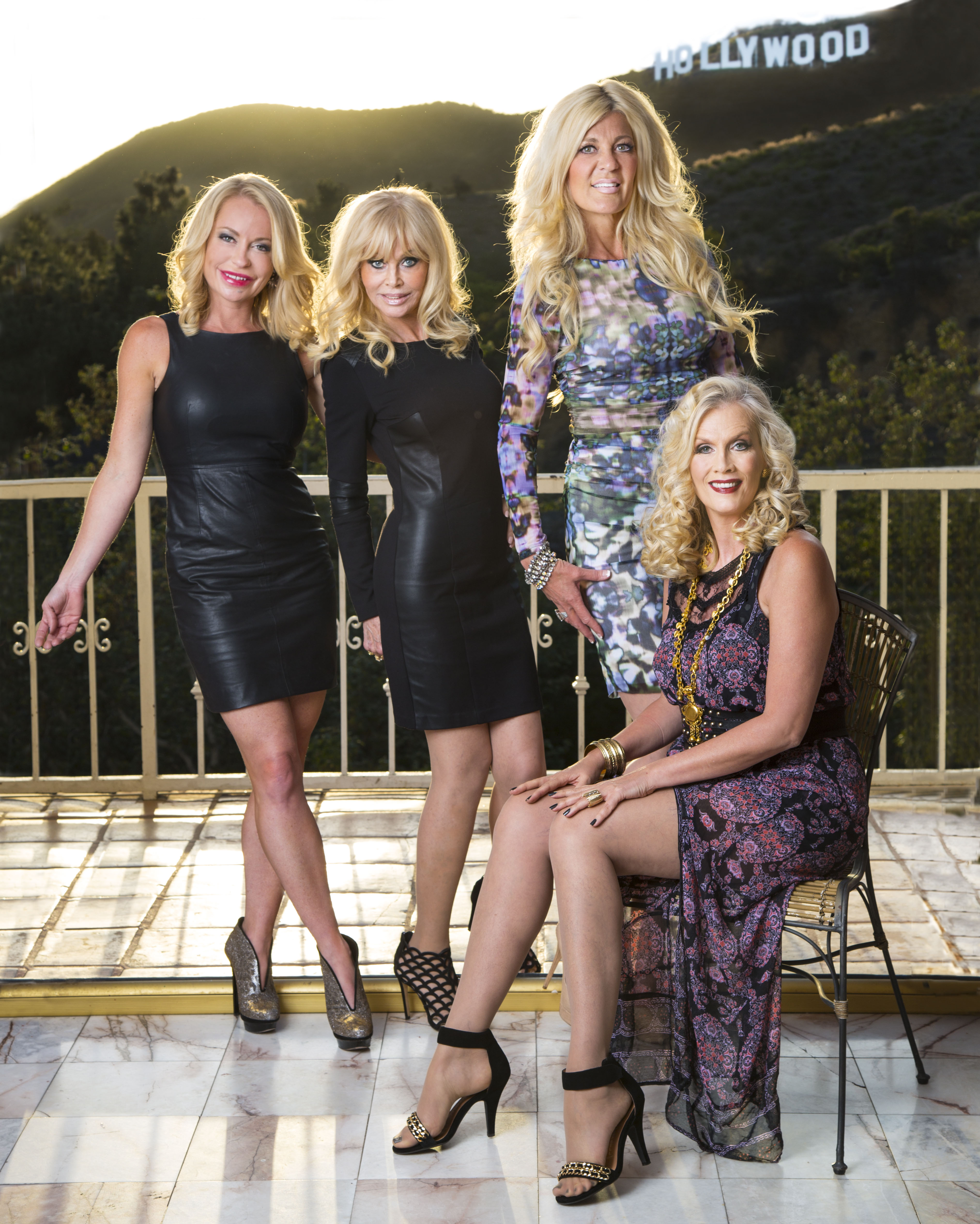
Ekland (second from left) with Åsa Vesterlund, Maria Montazami and Gunilla Persson in 2014

Ekland had small roles in the Swedish films Kort är sommaren (1962) and Det är hos mig han har varit (1963), before landing her first major supporting part in the American George Marshall-directed Western Advance to the Rear (1964).

In the same year Ekland was originally cast in the dramatic role of Karen Eriksson in the British film Guns at Batasi starring Richard Attenborough, Jack Hawkins, Flora Robson, and sixties heartthrob actor/singer John Leyton. However, she left the Pinewood production after only three weeks into filming due to tension with her new husband Peter Sellers, who was apparently so paranoid about Ekland having an affair with Leyton he secretly asked his old acting friends, David Lodge and Graham Stark who were co-starring in the picture, to keep an eye on her. After being quizzed nightly on the telephone by Sellers about her scenes and who she was with, Ekland left the shoot to join Sellers in Los Angeles. Ekland has said that Sellers insisted that she leave the set, come to America, then claim that an illness prevented her from returning. Her role was quickly recast and completed by Mia Farrow. In response, 20th Century Fox sued Ekland for $1.5 million; Sellers counter-sued for $4 million claiming the Fox suit caused him "mental distress and injury to his health".

In 1964, she appeared in the Christmas television film A Carol for Another Christmas with her husband Peter Sellers. She followed this with After the Fox (1966), also starring Sellers; she made one more film with Sellers, The Bobo (1967). This was followed with a lead role as an Amish girl turned New York City burlesque dancer in William Friedkin's musical The Night They Raided Minsky's (1968), which earned Ekland critical acclaim. Next came Stiletto (1969), a crime drama, based on a novel by Harold Robbins, co-starring Alex Cord. She then starred in a string of Italian films, Machine Gun McCain (1969), The Conspirators (1969), and as Antigone in The Year of the Cannibals (1970).

In 1971 she was cast as a leading lady and gun moll in the crime film Get Carter, opposite Michael Caine, which firmly established her as a blonde bombshell. The 1970s also saw Ekland in several horror films, including What the Peeper Saw (1972) as a disturbed bride; the Agatha Christie adaptation Endless Night (1972), playing the friend and companion of an American heiress; and as a hallucinatory figure in the anthology film Asylum (1972) opposite Charlotte Rampling. Her best-known horror role came in 1973's The Wicker Man, in which she played a Pagan villager and seductress; however, her voice was dubbed in the film to disguise her Swedish-accented English.

Other roles included in the thriller The Ultimate Thrill (1974) and the British drama Baxter! (1973). On television, she was cast in the TV film The Six Million Dollar Man: Wine, Women and War (1973) opposite Lee Majors. Ekland's next prominent role came when she was cast as the Bond girl, Mary Goodnight, in the James Bond film The Man with the Golden Gun (1974), which received mixed reviews but furthered Ekland's status as a sex symbol. She played a comedy role in Royal Flash, which has been described as "perhaps her best screen work".

In 1976 Ekland provided the French spoken part at the end of then-boyfriend Rod Stewart's single "Tonight's the Night (Gonna Be Alright)". Ekland also portrayed biographical characters, such as the one based on real-life actress Anny Ondra (boxer Max Schmeling's wife) in the television film Ring of Passion (1978). Ekland was also featured in the horror films The Monster Club (1980) and Satan's Mistress (1982).

In 1978 she hosted a syndicated television series for American International Television called "Jukebox." Directed by Bruce Gowers and produced and written by Paul Flattery for Jon Roseman Productions, the series featured then-nascent music videos, most of which were originally produced by Roseman's companies in the United States and England.

Ekland had supporting roles in independent feature films. She appeared in the comedy film Fraternity Vacation (1985), followed by a role in the slasher film Moon in Scorpio (1988), and as prostitute Mariella Novotny in the feature Scandal (1989) about the Profumo affair.

She has guest-starred on various television series, including an appearance on the popular TV series Superboy, playing an alien disguised as Lara, Superboy's biological mother, during the show's second season in 1990. Ekland published a beauty and fitness book, Sensual Beauty: How to Achieve It (1984), followed by a fitness video in 1992. In the BBC television series I Love the '70s (1999), she hosted the 1971 episode in homage to her role in the film Get Carter.

Ekland's later career has mainly consisted of stage and television, with her last feature film role being in The Children (1990). She appeared on stage as a cast member in Cinderella at the Regent Theatre, Stoke-on-Trent in December 1999 and January 2000. She also appeared in Grumpy Old Women Live and participated in the Swedish reality show Stjärnorna på slottet (The stars at the castle) along with Peter Stormare, Arja Saijonmaa, Jan Malmsjö, and Magnus Härenstam. In December 2007 and January 2008 she starred again in Cinderella at the Wyvern Theatre, Swindon. She appeared as a guest on the British daytime television show Loose Women, in January 2008. From December 2008 to January 2009 Ekland starred in Cinderella at the Shaw Theatre in London. In a rare instance of her singing, she performed the song My Prince, originally recorded by Lara Pulver on the album Act One – Songs from the Musicals of Alexander S. Bermange. In 2009–10 she played the Fairy Godmother in Cinderella at Princess Theatre, Torquay. In December 2010 she starred as the 'Fairy Pea Pod' in Jack and the Beanstalk at the Kings Theatre, Southsea. She starred in further pantomimes at the Theatre Royal, Windsor, in 2011 and 2012.

In 2010 Ekland took part in the reality TV show I'm a Celebrity...Get Me Out of Here!, where she was the fourth celebrity to be voted off the show. Ekland was one of the housewives of Svenska Hollywoodfruar (English: Swedish Hollywood Wives) on TV3 from 2012 to 2014. In 2018 she participated in Let's Dance broadcast on TV4. She was the first to be eliminated on 30 March, placing 11th.

In 2020 Ekland appeared in Season 4 of BBC TV's The Real Marigold Hotel. Also in 2020, she toured the country in a production of The Cat and the Canary, playing Mrs. Pleasant. Although the production halted due to the COVID-19 pandemic, it resumed touring in late 2021.

== Writing ==
Britt Ekland's autobiography True Britt was published in 1980 by Prentice-Hall, Inc. The book is an archetypal celebrity tell-all, chronicling her marriage to Peter Sellers and subsequent relationship with Rod Stewart.

Ekland is also the author of one novel, Det Ljuva Livet (Sweet Life).

In 2024, Ekland contributed an introduction to the LGBT+ horror novel, The Sugar Pit by William Jackson, published by the Cambridge Queer Press. Ekland refers to the illusory nature of all fiction. For The Wicker Man, spring had to be faked by glueing leaves to trees as principal photography took place in the autumn and Ekland herself was pregnant requiring some of her nude scenes to be filmed with a body double.

== Personal life ==
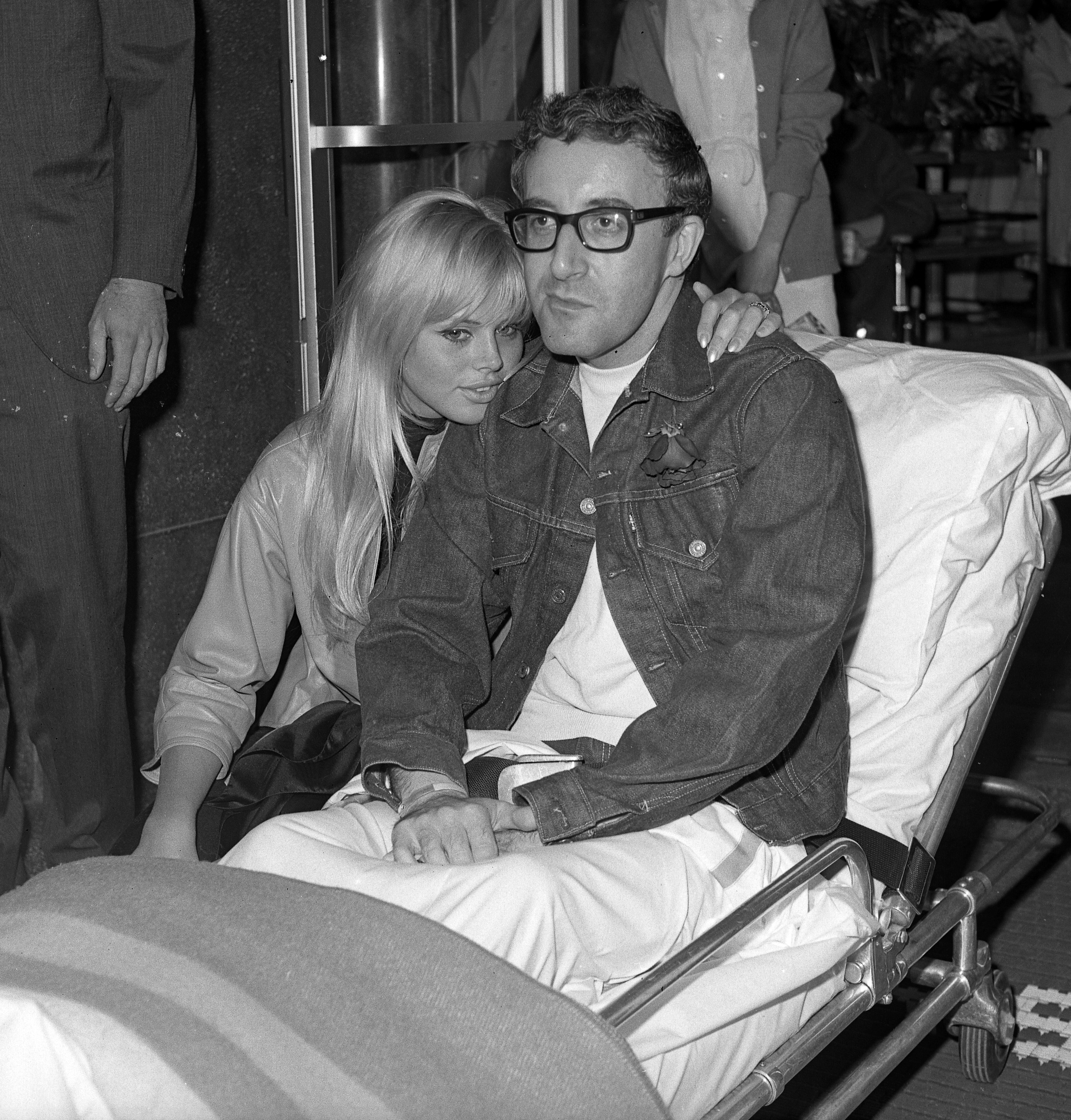
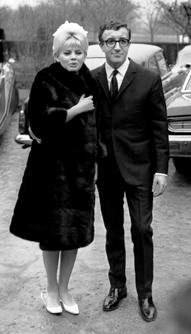
Sellers with his second wife Britt Ekland in 1964

=== Relationships and family ===
Ekland became famous overnight as a result of her 1964 whirlwind romance and marriage to English actor and comedian Peter Sellers, who proposed after seeing her photograph in the paper and then meeting her in London. She stood by him after he suffered a series of heart attacks shortly after their marriage. Ekland was stepmother to Sellers's children Sarah and Michael (who died of a heart attack at about the same age as his father). In January 1965 they had a daughter, Victoria. The couple made three films together, A Carol for Another Christmas (1964), After the Fox (1966), and The Bobo (1967), before divorcing in 1968.

On 17 December 1968, Mr Justice Alan Orr granted Ekland a decree nisi for divorce in the High Court on the grounds of cruelty by Sellers, who did not contest the proceedings.

In June 1973, Ekland had a son, Nicolai Adler, with record producer Lou Adler.

She also had a much publicised romance with rock star Rod Stewart. They were introduced in 1975 by Joan Collins and lived together for more than two years, with Ekland giving up her career to focus on their relationship.

From 1979 to 1981, she dated and became engaged to singer Phil Lewis of the groups Girl and L.A. Guns.

In 1984, at age 42, she married Stray Cats drummer Slim Jim Phantom, who was 23. They had a son, Thomas Jefferson, in 1988. They divorced in 1992.

== Legacy ==
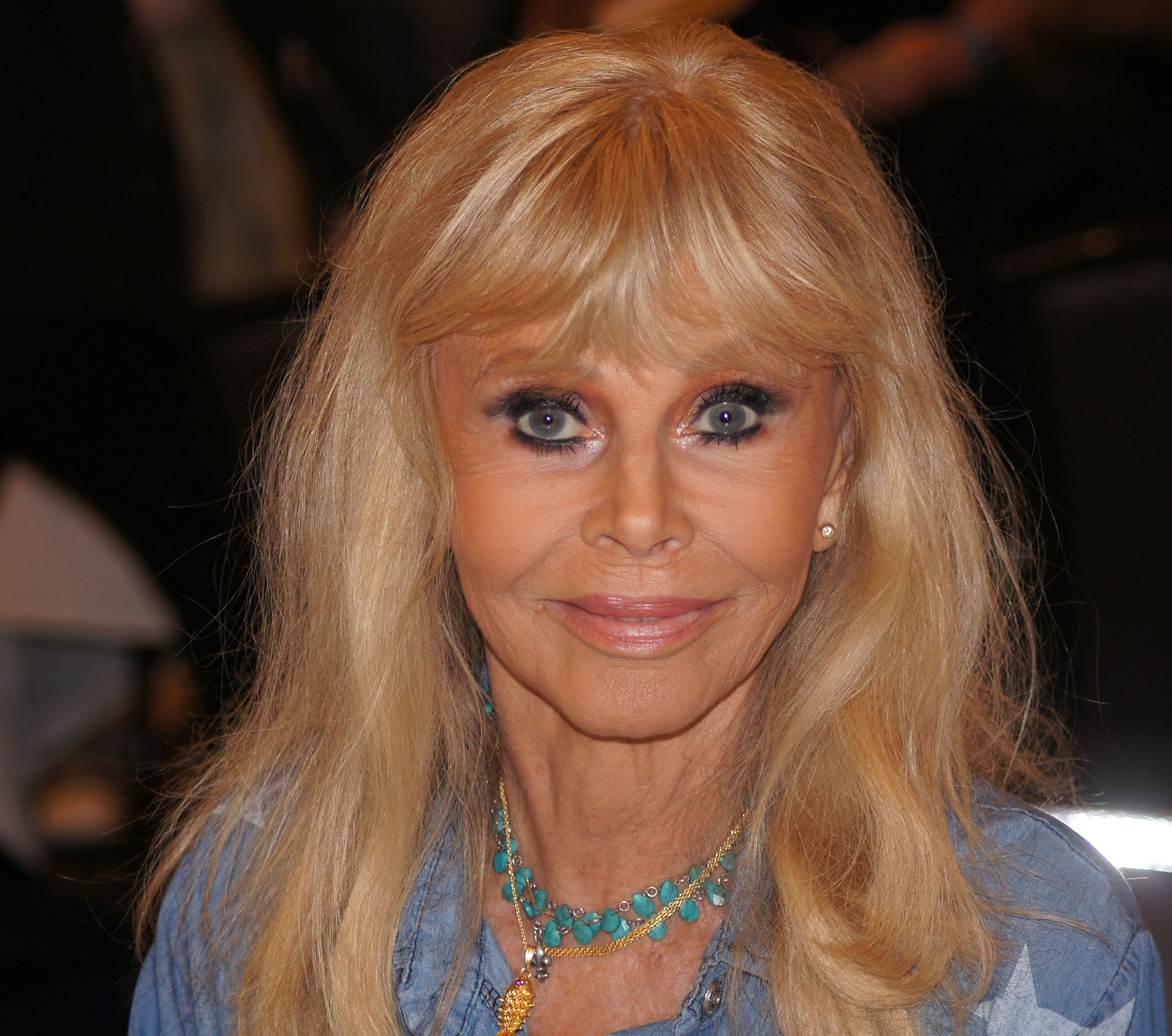
Ekland in 2019

While Rod Stewart's domestic partner, Ekland inspired his hit song "Tonight's the Night (Gonna Be Alright)," which was 1977's overall #1 song. The song features a French spoken part by Ekland.

In 2004, Charlize Theron portrayed Ekland in The Life and Death of Peter Sellers. Ekland accompanied Theron to the Cannes Film Festival, where she became highly emotional when she saw the film.

In the 2018 film My Dinner with Hervé, Helena Mattsson played Ekland.

== Filmography ==
=== Film ===
Year	Title	Role	Notes
1962	Short Is the Summer	Edvarda's Friend	
1963	It's With Me He's Been	Li's Workmate	Uncredited
1963	To Bed or Not to Bed	Extra	Uncredited
1963	The Commandant	Iris	
1963	The Prize	Nudist	
1964	Advance to the Rear	Greta	
1964	A Carol for Another Christmas	Mother	
1964	Four Bullets for Joe	Extra	
1965	Do Not Disturb	Party girl	Uncredited
1966	After the Fox	Gina Romantica	
1967	Too Many Thieves	Claudia	
1967	The Bobo	Olimpia Segura	
1967	The Double Man	Gina	
1968	The Night They Raided Minsky's	Rachel Schpitendavel	
1969	Stiletto	Illeana	
1969	Machine Gun McCain	Irene Tucker	
1969	The Conspirators	Princess Spada	
1969	The Year of the Cannibals	Antigone	
1970	Tintomara	Adolphine	
1971	Percy	Dorothy Chiltern-Barlow	
1971	Get Carter	Anna	
1972	A Time for Loving	Josette Papillion	
1972	What the Peeper Saw	Elise	
1972	Endless Night	Greta	
1972	Asylum	Lucy	
1973	Baxter!	Chris Bentley	
1973	The Wicker Man	Willow MacGregor	
1973	The Six Million Dollar Man: Wine, Women and War	Katrina Volana	
1974	The Ultimate Thrill	Michelle Parlay	
1974	The Man with the Golden Gun	Mary Goodnight	
1975	Royal Flash	Duchess Irma	
1976	High Velocity	Mrs. Andersen	
1977	Casanova & Co.	Countess Trivulzi	
1978	Slavers	Anna von Erken	
1979	King Solomon's Treasure	Queen Nyleptha	
1980	The Hostage Tower	Leah	
1981	The Monster Club	Mrs. Busotsky	
1982	Satan's Mistress	Ann-Marie	
1983	Dead Wrong	Penny Lancaster	
1983	Erotic Images	Julie Todd	
1983	Dr. Yes: The Hyannis Affair	Susannah	
1984	Love Scenes	Annie	
1985	Fraternity Vacation	Eyvette	
1985	Marbella	Deborah	
1987	Moon in Scorpio	Linda	
1989	Scandal	Mariella Novotny	
1989	Beverly Hills Vamp	Madame Cassandra	
1989	Cold Heat	Jackie Mallon	
1990	The Children	Lady Zinnia Wrench	
2006	Search	Lisa's neighbour	
2020	Jeepers Creepers	Fantasy Lover	voice

=== Television ===
Year	Title	Role	Notes
1965	Armchair Theatre	Karen	Episode: "A Cold Peace"
1966	The Trials of O'Brien	Claudia	2 episodes
1971	Aquarius	Mrs. X	Episode: "Strindberg's Stronger"
1972	McCloud	Vicki Erickson	Episode: "The Barefoot Stewardess Caper"
1977	McCloud	Tatiana Krasnavian	Episode: ""The Moscow Connection"
1978	Ring of Passion	Amy Ondra Schmeling	TV film
1978	The Great Wallendas	Jenny Wallenda	TV film
1978	Battlestar Galactica	Tenna	2 episodes
1979	Return of the Saint	Laura	Episode: "The Murder Cartel"
1979	Skeppsredaren	Patricia	All 6 episodes
1980	Fantasy Island	Aphrodite	Episode: "Aphrodite"
1980	The Love Boat	Karen Ellison	Episode: "Vicki's First Love"
1981	Charlotte Löwensköld and Anna Svärd	The Women	Episode: "Part Five"
1981	Fantasy Island	Berniece Williams	"The Proxy Billionaire"
1981	Valley of the Dolls	Françoise	Both episodes
1982	The Love Boat	Alice Robbins	Episode: "Doc Take the Fifth"
1982	Fantasy Island	Clarissa Bevis	Episode: "House of Dolls"
1982	Matt Houston	Vera Martin	Episode: "Deadly Fashion"
1983	Fantasy Island	Linda	Episode: "Love Island"
1984	The Fall Guy	Britt Ekland	Episode: "Always Say Always"
1985	Simon & Simon	Samantha Blake	Episode: "Love and/or Marriage"
1985	The Golden Boy	Mrs. Pidlington	TV film
1990	Superboy	Lara Lor-Van	Episodes: "Escape to Earth," "Abandon Earth"
1990	Grand	Viveca	Episode: "Blow Off"
1994	Absolutely Fabulous	Britt Ekland	Episode: "New Best Friend"
2002	Lexx	Dulcibella Sternflanks	Episode: "Prime Ridge"

=== Reality television ===
Year	Title	Role	Notes
1970	The Dean Martin Show	Herself	Episode: "6.3"
1981	Barbara Woodhouse Goes to Beverly Hills	Herself	documentary
1982	Electric Blue 3	Herself	
1984	The Fall Guy	Herself	Episode: "Always Say Always"
1992	Bara med Britt	Herself / Host	
1997	Brass Eye	Herself	Episode: "Animals"
2007–2008	Stjärnorna på slottet	Herself	5 episodes
2008–2021	Loose Women	Herself / Presenster	5 episodes
2010	I'm a Celebrity...Get Me Out of Here!	Herself / Contestant	20 episodes
2011	Celebrity Antiques Road Trip	Herself	episode #1.8
2013	Astrid in Wonderland	Herself	Episode #5.8
2013–2015	Svenska Hollywoodfruar	Herself	
2018	Let's Dance	Herself / Contestant	2 episodes
2020	The Real Marigold Hotel	Herself	Season 4, 4 episodes

== Discography ==
- "Do it to Me once more (with feeling)" / "Private Party" (1979) No. 15 SWE
