= Jo Eisinger =

American screenwriter (1909–1991)

- Born: July 24, 1909
- Died: 1991
- Occupation: Screenwriter

Jo Eisinger (July 24, 1909 – January 1991) was a film and television writer whose career spanned more than 40 years from the early 1940s well into the 1980s. He is widely recognized as the writer of two of the most psychologically complex film noirs, Gilda (1946) and Night and the City (1950).

== Career ==
Eisinger wrote the books on which the Broadway plays What Big Ears! (1942) and A Point of Honor (1937) were based. His novel The Walls Came Tumbling Down (1943) was adapted for the long-running radio drama program Suspense in 1944; the episode featured screen and radio actors Keenan Wynn and Hans Conried. A film version of The Walls Came Tumbling Down starring Edgar Buchanan and George Macready was released in 1946.

Jo Eisinger started writing for radio, penning numerous segments for The Adventures of Sam Spade series then the television series The Cases of Eddie Drake. He returned to thriller and private eye adventure series writing for the ITC television series Danger Man (1960–61) and the mid-1980s HBO series Philip Marlowe, Private Eye. His script for an episode of the latter show, "The Pencil", earned him a 1984 Edgar Award.

His credits include The Sleeping City (1950) and Crime of Passion (1957), a coda to the films of the noir style, for which he wrote the story as well as the screenplay. Starring Barbara Stanwyck, a strikingly modern commentary about how women were driven mad by the limitations imposed upon them in the postwar period, and Oscar Wilde (1960), starring Robert Morley and Ralph Richardson.

Eisinger co-wrote the portmanteau film The Dirty Game (1965) co-directed by Terence Young, then collaborated with Young on The Poppy Is Also a Flower (1966) based on an idea by Ian Fleming, The Rover (1967), from the novel by Joseph Conrad that starred Rita Hayworth and Anthony Quinn, Cold Sweat (1970) starring Charles Bronson and The Jigsaw Man (1983), starring Michael Caine and Laurence Olivier, the latter two films co-scripted with Young's wife mystery writer Dorothea Bennett.

== Personal life ==
Jo Eisinger's second marriage was to Lorain Beaumont. Eisinger used his wife's maiden name for Mr. Beaumont, one of the characters in The Walls Came Tumbling Down.

== Filmography ==
Screenplays

- The Spider (1945), based on a play by Fulton Oursler and Lowell Brentano
- Gilda (1946), based on a story by E. A. Ellington
- Night and the City (1950), based on the novel Night and the City by Gerald Kersh
- The Sleeping City (1950)
- The System (1953), based on a story by Edith Grafton and Samuel Grafton
- Bedevilled (1955)
- Crime of Passion (1957)
- The Big Boodle (1957), based on a novel by Robert Sylvester
- The House of the Seven Hawks (1959), based on a novel by Victor Canning
- As the Sea Rages (1959), based on a novel by Werner Helwig
- Mistress of the World (1960), remake of a 1919 silent film
- Oscar Wilde (1960), based on the play Oscar Wilde by Leslie Stokes and Sewell Stokes
- The Poppy Is Also a Flower (1966), based on a story by Ian Fleming
- The Rover (1967), based on the novel The Rover by Joseph Conrad
- The Scorpio Letters (1967), based on the novel The Scorpio Letters by Victor Canning
- They Came to Rob Las Vegas (1968), based on a novel by André Lay
- Cold Sweat (1970), based on a novel by Richard Matheson
- The Jigsaw Man (1983), based on a novel by Dorothea Bennett

Film Adaptation

- The Walls Came Tumbling Down (1946), based on Jo Eisinger's novel
