= Broken Vows (2016 film) =

- Promotional poster
- Directed by: Bram Coppens
- Written by: Jim Agnew; Sean Keller
- Produced by: Wendy Benge
- Starring: Wes Bentley; Jaimie Alexander; Cam Gigandet; Alexandra Breckenridge; Astrid Bryan
- Cinematography: Kees Van Oostrum
- Edited by: Curtiss Clayton
- Music by: David Julyan
- Production company: Bullet Entertainment
- Distributed by: Lionsgate; Grindstone Entertainment Group
- Release dates: September 22, 2016 (Germany); October 11, 2016
- Running time: 90 minutes
- Country: United States
- Language: English

Broken Vows is a 2016 American psychological thriller film directed by Bram Coppens from a screenplay written by Jim Agnew and Sean Keller, starring Wes Bentley, Jaimie Alexander, Cam Gigandet, Alexandra Breckenridge, and Astrid Bryan.

== Summary ==
Patrick (Wes Bentley) is a charming yet troubled man. He meets Tara (Jaimie Alexander) at her bachelorette party. They have a one night stand, and when she comes back home, he goes into a psychotic rage, imagining that he is in love with her; he even goes as far as tattooing her name, Tara, on his arm.

Patrick has her smartphone, so he starts cancelling the wedding plans, the venue, the florist, etc. Tara is able to reverse all the cancellations. Her friend (Alexandra Breckenridge) gets a private investigator (Matt Gerald) who finds out that he has had some similar episodes in the past. He had fallen in love with his baby sitter when he was younger and wanted to set fire to the house.

But he is obsessed, he has hallucinations of Tara loving him. At one point, he finds Tara's sister and befriends her and his way to the wedding party.

Tara's friend arranges for the investigator to attack Patrick at the wedding party, but Patrick manages to recover. That same night, Patrick follows Tara's friend home and kills her, using her computer to crash the honeymoon. He kills a staff member by luring him outside after cutting the electricity. He attacks Tara's newlywed husband, cuts off Michael's wedding ring with a straight razor and confronts Tara at the beach and while holding her her at knife point with the straight razor. She fights him off and sets him on fire with a tiki torch, but he recovers again. She finds Michael, but Patrick is relentless and goes on looking for Tara.

Patrick attacks Michael again, but Tara finally is able to choke Patrick to death with rope she found in an abandoned boat.

In the final scene, Tara and her husband recover at a hospital, but the doctor lets her know that she is pregnant, causing Tara to have a shocked reaction to the news, ending the movie with questions as to who the father could be.....

== Cast ==
- Wes Bentley as Patrick
- Jaimie Alexander as Tara
- Cam Gigandet as Michael, Tara's fiance
- Alexandra Breckenridge as Debra, one of Tara's best friends
- Astrid Bryan as Justine
- Matt Riedy as Mr. Bloom
- Alex Ladove as Emily, Tara's younger sister
- Emily Robinson as Annie, Tara's youngest sister

== Production ==
In June 2014, Wes Bentley and Jaimie Alexander joined the cast of the film, with Bram Coppens directing the film in his directorial debut, from a screenplay by Jim Agnew and Sean Keller. Wendy Benge and Larry Ladove served as producer and executive producer, respectively, while Stonecreek Films served as the financier. In July 2014, Cam Gigandet, Alex Ladove, Alexandra Breckenridge, and Astrid Bryan joined the cast of the film.

== Release ==
In February 2016, Grindstone Entertainment Group and Lionsgate acquired U.S. distribution rights to the film. The film was released through direct-to-DVD and video on demand on October 11, 2016.
