= Mariella Novotny =

English socialite and prostitute

Mariella Novotny (born Stella Marie Capes, 9 May 1941 – 1 February 1983) was an English socialite and prostitute who was part of Christine Keeler's social circle and mixed extensively with British establishment figures in the events leading up to the Profumo affair.

== Biography ==
Novotny was born in Yorkshire in 1941. She married the club owner and antique dealer Horace 'Hod' Dibben in January 1960.

She has been said to have had relationships with John F. Kennedy and Robert Kennedy, and to have worked with MI5.

In the 1989 film Scandal about the Profumo affair, she was portrayed by Britt Ekland.

A biography, 'The Novotny Papers', was published in 2021 by Lilian Pizzichini, who had previously written a book about her grandfather Charlie Taylor, a London criminal. Pizzichini states that Novotny gave birth to the illegitimate child of Eddie Chapman (a.k.a. Agent Zigzag, the WW2 double agent) in the late 1960s. She also claims Novotny had been working as an undercover agent in the 1970s, assisting the Operation Countryman investigation of police corruption within the Metropolitan Police, notably the Flying Squad. Pizzichini suggests one of Novotny's targets had been her grandfather.

== Death ==
She died on 9 May 1983, aged 41. The inquest found she had taken a fatal dose of Temazepam and concluded 'death by misadventure'. Her psychiatrist later said that Novotny suffered from a "hysterical personality disorder". Her late husband 'Hod' Dibben told an investigative journalist that Novotny's house was burgled after her death, with all her papers stolen. Dibben further alleged she had been in the process of writing her memoirs.
