= Antonia Santiago Amador =

Spanish flamenco dancer (born 1946)

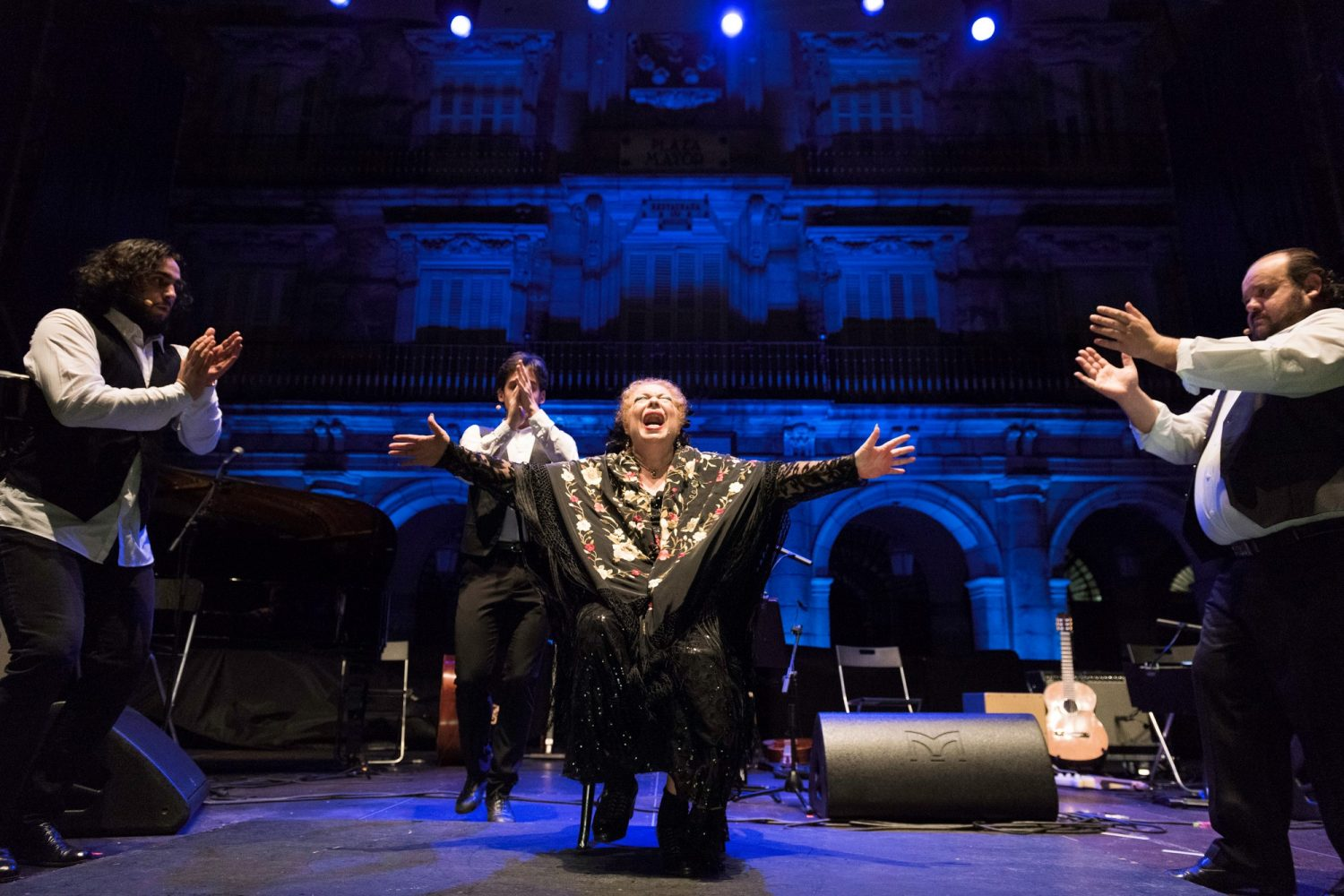
La Chana performance in Madrid in 2018

Antonia Santiago Amador (born 24 December 1946) better known by her stage name, La Chana, is a Catalan Romani dancer.

Born in Barcelona in 1946, Amador Santiago is best known as a flamenco dancer with the stage name of La Chana, inherited from her uncle, the guitarist El Chano. She had two significant periods in her professional career, between 1966 and 1979 and again between 1985 and 1991. She was featured in an extended dance sequence in the 1968 Peter Sellers film The Bobo.

She married Felix Comas.
