= The Sleeping City =

1950 film by George Sherman

- Theatrical release poster
- Directed by: George Sherman
- Written by: Jo Eisinger
- Produced by: Leonard Goldstein
- Starring: Richard Conte; Coleen Gray
- Cinematography: William Miller
- Edited by: Frank Gross
- Music by: Frank Skinner
- Color process: Black and white
- Production company: Universal Pictures
- Distributed by: Universal Pictures
- Release dates: September 20, 1950 (Boston); September 20, 1950 (NYC); October 16, 1950 (USA)
- Running time: 86 minutes
- Country: United States
- Language: English

The Sleeping City is a 1950 American film noir crime film in semidocumentary style that was set in and filmed at New York's Bellevue Hospital. Directed by George Sherman, it stars Richard Conte and Coleen Gray.

The film is notable for its photography, and was one of the few motion pictures of the era to be shot entirely on location.

The film begins with an unusual prologue, featuring Conte, to assure the audience that the story is "completely fictional" and did not take place at Bellevue or in New York City. The prologue was inserted at the insistence of New York mayor William O'Dwyer, who felt that the script besmirched the reputation of the city-run hospital.

== Plot ==
An intern is shot mysteriously on an East River pier adjoining Bellevue Hospital. The chief investigating detective views this as a difficult case, so with the cooperation of the commissioner of hospitals, he assigns detective Fred Rowan, who had been a medical corpsman, to go undercover as intern Fred Gilbert.

Rowan becomes involved with the attractive nurse Ann Sebastian and also becomes friendly with Pop Ware, a popular elevator operator. Ware, who works part-time taking bets, seems initially to be benign, but it becomes apparent that he has been loaning money to the interns, including the slain intern and Rowan's roommate Steve Anderson, who is depressed and commits suicide.

Rowan deliberately loses money betting with Ware, and Ware says that Rowan can pay off his bet by stealing narcotics. Rowan plays along, encouraged by Ann, but eventually stops providing drugs to Ware. When Ware tries to kill Rowan, he is killed in a shootout on the hospital roof.

Investigators find that Ann had worked as a courier for Ware. Rowan, turning aside Ann's pleas, places her under arrest.

== Cast ==
- Richard Conte as Fred Rowan
- Coleen Gray as Ann Sebastian
- Richard Taber as Pop Ware
- John Alexander as Insp. Gordon
- Peggy Dow as Kathy Hall
- Alex Nicol as Dr. Steve Anderson

== Reception ==
Bosley Crowther of The New York Times dismissed the film, writing that "New York's famous Bellevue Hospital is the literal and alluring locale for a frankly fictitious mystery drama about internes and the smuggling of dope ... But beyond this pictorial asset, which is employed mainly for atmosphere, there is little about The Sleeping City to distinguish it from any thriller film ... for all its performance and direction by George Sherman in a tensile thriller style, The Sleeping City is just a mystery-chase film with a hospital as its locale. It is not the fine cosmopolitan drama of medical practice and human life that it had every chance to be."

Bruce Eder has compared the film to another of the "cinéma vérité-style" crime thrillers produced in the 1950s: "Universal made The Sleeping City as its own contribution to the cycle, directed by George Sherman. The results weren't as stylistically striking as The Naked City, but [it] had an appeal all its own -- the location shots had a more polished and slightly more visually lyrical look than those of The Naked City, and if the music by Frank Skinner (who'd scored part of the Dassin movie) wasn't as ornate as that of Miklós Rózsa (who scored the Dassin movie's finale), it helped sustain the tension set up by the script."

== See also ==
- List of American films of 1950
