= A Merry Mancini Christmas =

Studio album by Henry Mancini
- Released: 1966
- Recorded: 1966
- Genre: Christmas music, traditional pop
- Length: 34:35
- Label: RCA Victor
- Producer: Joe Reisman

Henry Mancini chronology
The Latin Sound of Henry Mancini (1966)	A Merry Mancini Christmas (1966)	Encore! More of the Concert Sound of Henry Mancini (1967)

A Merry Mancini Christmas is a 1966 album by Henry Mancini of orchestral and choral arrangements of Christmas music. In addition to traditional Christmas songs, it also contains the original Mancini composition "Carol for Another Christmas", the theme of the 1964 television film of the same name.

The album peaked at number 12 on the Billboard's Best Bets For Christmas Album chart in 1970.

== Reception ==
Professional ratings
Review scores
Source	Rating
Allmusic	4.5/5 stars

The initial Billboard review from October 29, 1966, wrote that "It's an important addition to the Christmas shelf because Mancini's arrangements are as fresh and familiar as the material is familiar and lasting."

The album was reviewed by Stephen Thomas Erlewine at Allmusic who described it as an "ideal holiday record" and added that "...the album is filled with the lush arrangements that are his aural signature, and they sound perfect when matched with these 11 Christmas medleys and carols. It is a warm, appealing record that blends easily into the background, making it a good choice for holiday gatherings of all sorts."

== Track listing ==
1. "The Little Drummer Boy" (Harry Simeone, Katherine Kennicott Davis, Henry Onorati) - 3:17
2. Medley: "Jingle Bells"/"Sleigh Ride" (James Pierpont)/(LeRoy Anderson) - 3:40
3. "The Christmas Song" (Mel Tormé, Robert Wells) - 3:32
4. Medley: "Winter Wonderland"/"Silver Bells" (Richard B. Smith, Felix Bernard)/(Ray Evans, Jay Livingston) - 3:51
5. Medley: "Frosty the Snowman"/"Rudolph the Red-Nosed Reindeer" (Jack Rollins, Steve Nelson)/(Johnny Marks) - 2:28
6. "White Christmas" (Irving Berlin) - 2:43
7. "Carol for Another Christmas" (Mancini) - 2:36
8. Medley: "Silent Night"/"O Holy Night"/"O Little Town of Bethlehem" (Franz Xaver Gruber, Joseph Mohr)/(Adolphe Adam, Placide Cappeau)/(Phillips Brooks, Lewis Redner) - 6:42
9. Medley: "God Rest You Merry, Gentlemen"/"Deck the Halls"/"Hark! The Herald Angels Sing" (Traditional)/(Traditional)/(Charles Wesley) - 3:17
10. Medley: "We Three Kings"/"O Come, All Ye Faithful"/"Joy to the World" (John Henry Hopkins Jr.)/(John Francis Wade)/(Isaac Watts, Lowell Mason) - 3:34
11. Medley: "It Came Upon the Midnight Clear"/"Away in a Manger"/"The First Noel" (Richard Storrs Willis, Edmund Sears)/(William J. Kirkpatrick)/(Traditional) - 5:03

== Personnel ==
- Unidentified orchestra
- Unidentified chorus
- Henry Mancini - arranger
- Joe Reisman - producer
- Dick Bogert - recording engineer

Featured soloists

- Erno Neufeld, concertmaster
- Arthur Gleghorn, flute
- Arnold Kobentz, oboe
- Vincent De Rosa, French horn
- Pearl Kaufman, harpsichord
- Laurindo Almeida, guitar

== Certifications ==
Region	Certification	Certified units/sales
United States (RIAA)	Gold	500,000^{^}
^{^} Shipments figures based on certification alone.

== See also ==
- A Carol for Another Christmas, Mancini's theme from the film (track #7)
