= Crime of Passion (1957 film) =

1957 film by Gerd Oswald

- Theatrical release poster
- Directed by: Gerd Oswald
- Screenplay by: Jo Eisinger
- Produced by: Herman Cohen
- Starring: Barbara Stanwyck; Sterling Hayden; Raymond Burr
- Cinematography: Joseph LaShelle
- Edited by: Marjorie Fowler
- Music by: Paul Dunlap
- Production company: Robert Goldstein Productions
- Distributed by: United Artists
- Release date: January 9, 1957 (New York City)
- Running time: 86 minutes
- Country: United States
- Language: English

Crime of Passion is a 1957 American film noir crime drama directed by Gerd Oswald and written by Jo Eisinger. The cast features Barbara Stanwyck, Sterling Hayden, and Raymond Burr.

== Plot ==
Los Angeles police detective Lieutenant Bill Doyle and his partner, Captain Charlie Alidos, track a female fugitive wanted for murder to San Francisco. Bill meets Kathy Ferguson, a San Francisco newspaper advice columnist, who has helped the investigation by locating the fugitive and gaining her trust. The two fall in love. Kathy's front-page story on the case leads to an offer of employment in New York City, but in spite of having declared she has no interest in marriage and homemaking, she abandons her career, marries Bill and moves to Los Angeles.

Kathy's new role as a suburban wife and homemaker quickly makes her unhappy. She wants her husband to make a name for himself, but Bill has different values; he works simply in order to afford a comfortable lifestyle. Without his knowledge, Kathy schemes to propel her husband up the career ladder. She intentionally causes an automobile accident with Alice Pope as a ploy to become acquainted with Alice's husband, police inspector Tony Pope, the head of Bill's division. Pope realizes what Kathy has done but says nothing.

Kathy's continuing ploys bring her into conflict with Sara, Charlie's equally ambitious wife, and Charlie begins, at every opportunity, to find fault with Bill. Vicious rumours circulate about Kathy's relationship with Pope. When Bill sees a poison pen letter that Kathy has received, he rushes to work and, in front of two police witnesses, punches Charlie. Pope interrogates the men involved but considers the matter closed because Charlie reached for his gun when Bill angrily burst into the room, putting both men at fault. Charlie is transferred to another division, and Bill is given Charlie's former position as an acting homicide captain.

When Alice is hospitalized after succumbing to years of mental strain as a policeman's wife, Pope decides to retire. When he comes to inform Kathy about Alice's breakdown and his plans to leave his career, Kathy tries to persuade him to recommend Bill for the vacancy that his departure will create. During their talk, he seems to consider the idea favorably, then grabs and kisses her. She recoils at first, then embraces him, and things become intimate. Afterwards, however, he avoids her. When Kathy finally forces Pope to talk to her, he says that he regrets their one-night stand and dismisses any suggestion that he would recommend Bill for promotion as "pillow talk". He states that Bill is not qualified and that he will recommend Charlie as his successor, which infuriates Kathy.

One evening, Kathy ends up accompanying Bill to the police station. She steals a gun used in a robbery and murder that her husband is investigating. She confronts Pope at his home and appeals to him once again, pleading that she is asking not just for Bill but for herself. With Pope planning to recommend Charlie, she is consumed by guilt knowing that she had cheated on Bill without a result. She implores Pope to at least not recommend anyone. She argues that if Pope recommends no one, Bill will still have a chance to obtain the job and she will be left with some justification for her infidelity. Pope refuses, so she shoots him dead.

The entire department works on the investigation of Pope's murder. When the murder weapon is discovered to have been a gun that had been in police custody and somehow lost, Bill discovers that Kathy was present when the gun went missing. When Bill confronts Kathy and she confesses, she tells him, "Now I'll know just how much of a cop you really are." Bill responds, "The same cop, Kathy. The same cop you met in Frisco. Same cop I was ten years ago, pounding a beat. The same cop." He drives Kathy to headquarters and secures a room for her to be questioned about the murder.

== Cast ==
- Barbara Stanwyck as Kathy Ferguson Doyle
- Sterling Hayden as Police Lieutenant Bill Doyle
- Raymond Burr as Police Inspector Anthony Pope
- Fay Wray as Alice Pope
- Virginia Grey as Sara Alidos
- Royal Dano as Police Captain Charlie Alidos
- Robert Griffin as Police Sergeant Jame
- Dennis Cross as Police Sergeant Jules
- Jay Adler as Mr. Nalence
- Stuart Whitman as Laboratory Technician
- Malcolm Atterbury as Police Officer Spitz
- Robert Quarry as Sam
- Gail Bonney as Mrs. London
- Joe Conley as Delivery Boy

== Reception ==
In a contemporary review for The New York Times, Howard Thompson called the film a "most curiously misguided dramatic missile" and criticized Stanwyck's performance: "[N]ever has she switched gears so abruptly during one performance as in this odd number ... As for Miss Stanwyck's transition from the nice, sassy gal in the press room to a maniacal stalker, we don't believe it. Come off it, Miss Stanwyck."

In a review for the Los Angeles Times, critic Philip K. Scheuer wrote: "The woman's character is so completely amoral—as is the tone of the whole picture—that I never found it quite convincing. And this despite an attempt to explain her 'drive' in terms of psychological instability. Also, as I say, this is our Barbara. She really shouldn't do this to us."

A review in The Boston Globe also questioned the film's believability: "[T]he writer and director have so often telegraphed their punches, so often overstated the case, that it becomes a rather unbelievable, squirmy sort of tale."

== See also ==
- List of American films of 1957
