= Cold Sweat (1970 film) =

- Theatrical release poster
- Directed by: Terence Young
- Screenplay by: Shimon Wincelberg; Jo Eisinger; Dorothea Bennett
- Based on: Ride the Nightmare by Richard Matheson
- Produced by: Robert Dorfmann; Maurice Jacquin
- Starring: Charles Bronson; Liv Ullmann; James Mason; Jill Ireland
- Cinematography: Jean Rabier
- Edited by: Johnny Dwyre
- Music by: Michel Magne
- Distributed by: Emerson Film Enterprises
- Release date: 14 June 1970
- Running time: 94 minutes
- Countries: France; Italy
- Language: English

Cold Sweat is a 1970 action thriller film starring Charles Bronson and directed by Terence Young. A French-Italian international co-production, it is based on the 1959 novel Ride the Nightmare by Richard Matheson. It was filmed in and around Beaulieu-sur-Mer.

== Plot ==
Joe Moran, an American living in France, must face his past when his wife Fabienne Martin and daughter Michèle are kidnapped by former fellow convicts turned narco-dealers he once double-crossed.

== Cast ==
- Charles Bronson as Joe Moran / Joe Martin
- Liv Ullmann as Fabienne Martin
- James Mason as Captain Ross
- Jill Ireland as Moira
- Jean Topart as Katanga
- Michel Constantin as Vermont aka Whitey (dubbed by David Hess)
- Luigi Pistilli as Fausto Gelardi
- Yannick De Lulle as Michèle Martin
- Paul Bonifas as the doctor
- Sabine Sun as the nurse
- Roger Mailles as Poker Player
- Nathalie Varallo as Violet
- Remo Mosconi as Marius
- Dominique Crosland as The Girl Scout Leader
- Yannick Deheth as Uncredited
- Gabriele Ferzetti as Uncredited
- Bob Ingarao as Fisherman (uncredited)

== Production ==
The film was known for an extended car chase with an Opel Commodore GS/E I6 involving Joe Moran (Charles Bronson)'s attempt to get a doctor (Paul Bonifas) to wounded drug dealer Ross (James Mason) in exchange for his wife Fabienne Martin (Liv Ullmann).

Ullmann complained in an interview that Bronson was rude to her and her daughter Linn during the filming. She claims that he returned her child to her when she wandered to his table and admonished her by saying "Please keep your child to yourself."
