= Stiletto (1969 film) =

1969 film by Bernard L. Kowalski

- 1969 theatrical poster
- Directed by: Bernard L. Kowalski
- Written by: A.J. Russell
- Based on: Stiletto by Harold Robbins
- Produced by: Norman Rosemont
- Starring: Alex Cord; Britt Ekland; Joseph Wiseman; Barbara McNair; Patrick O'Neal
- Cinematography: Jack Priestley
- Edited by: Frank Mazzola
- Music by: Sid Ramin
- Production company: Embassy Pictures
- Distributed by: Avco Embassy Pictures
- Release date: July 30, 1969
- Running time: 98 minutes
- Country: United States
- Language: English

Stiletto is a 1969 American crime film directed by Bernard L. Kowalski and starring Alex Cord, Britt Ekland and Patrick O'Neal. It is based on the novel Stiletto (1960) by Harold Robbins. The film marked the debut of Raul Julia.

== Plot ==
A rich, jet-setting playboy has a secret life: he is also a professional Mafia hitman. When he decides it's time to retire from that life, he finds that his former employers don't like the idea that someone who knows so much about them won't be under their control anymore, and decide to send their own hitmen to eliminate him.

== Cast ==
- Alex Cord as Count Cesare Cardinali
- Britt Ekland as Illeana
- Patrick O'Neal as Baker
- Joseph Wiseman as Matteo
- Barbara McNair as Ahn Dessie
- John Dehner as District Attorney
- Titos Vandis as Tonio
- Eduardo Ciannelli as Don Andrea
- Roy Scheider as Bennett
- Lincoln Kilpatrick as Hannibal Smith
- Louie Elias as Mann
- Luke Andreas as Macy
- Dominic Barto as Franchini
- James Tolkan as Edwards
- Amaru as Rosa
- Raul Julia as Party Guest

== See also ==
- List of American films of 1969
