= Carol for Another Christmas =

1964 television film directed by Joseph L. Mankiewicz

- Based on: A Christmas Carol by Charles Dickens
- Written by: Rod Serling
- Directed by: Joseph L. Mankiewicz
- Starring: Britt Ekland; Ben Gazzara; Sterling Hayden; Pat Hingle; Steve Lawrence; Percy Rodriguez; Eva Marie Saint; Peter Sellers; Robert Shaw; James Shigeta; Barbara Ann Teer
- Music by: Henry Mancini
- Country of origin: United States
- Original language: English

Production
- Producer: Joseph L. Mankiewicz
- Cinematography: Arthur J. Ornitz
- Editor: Nathan Greene
- Running time: 84 minutes

Original release
- Network: ABC
- Release: December 28, 1964

Title card

Carol for Another Christmas is a 1964 American TV movie, written by Rod Serling as a modernization of Charles Dickens' 1843 novella A Christmas Carol and a plea for global cooperation. It was the first in a planned series of television specials developed to promote the United Nations and educate viewers about its mission. Originally televised on the American Broadcasting Company (ABC) network on December 28, 1964, it was not shown again for 48 years, until Turner Classic Movies (TCM) broadcast it on December 16, 2012.

The film was the only television program ever directed by Joseph L. Mankiewicz, and includes Peter Sellers' first performance after recovering from a near-fatal heart attack earlier in 1964. The film also features Sterling Hayden, who had previously costarred with Sellers in Dr. Strangelove and Britt Ekland, who was married to Sellers at the time.

== Plot ==
On Christmas Eve, rich American industrialist Daniel Grudge (Hayden) sits alone in a dark room of his mansion playing a record of a World War II-era popular song, "Don't Sit Under the Apple Tree (with Anyone Else but Me)" by The Andrews Sisters. He looks at a framed display of war medals on the wall and seems about to cry. He shuts off the record player, but as he leaves the room, he hears the record start to play again of its own accord, despite the player being shut off. Downstairs, he meets a visitor, his nephew Fred (Gazzara). Grudge caustically notes that Fred always comes to him for help with various causes and asks what cause he is promoting this time. Fred complains that Grudge used his influence to cancel a cultural exchange program that Fred's university had planned with a Polish counterpart. In the ensuing argument with Fred, Grudge takes the isolationist position that the United States should stay out of international affairs and not participate in cultural exchange programs, foreign aid to the needy, or discussions at the United Nations. Grudge distrusts foreign countries, and contends that the U.S. should build up its arsenal, including nuclear weapons, and make sure other countries know the U.S. is willing to use them. Fred disagrees, arguing that the U.S. should help all people in need and foster international communication in order to avoid future wars and nuclear destruction. As Fred leaves, he reminds his uncle that they have one thing in common: their love for Grudge's son Marley, who was killed in World War II on Christmas Eve 1944.

After Fred leaves, Grudge once again hears the record playing upstairs, and sees a short vision of the deceased Marley sitting at the dining room table. Suddenly, Grudge finds himself on the deck of a fogbound troopship carrying coffins draped in flags, guarded by soldiers at attention. A soldier on board introduces himself as the Ghost of Christmas Past (Lawrence) and explains that the ship is carrying the dead of all nations from World War I. Through the fog, Grudge spots a second vessel carrying World War II's dead, and learns they are in a huge convoy, carrying the dead from conflicts through history. The Ghost suggests that the way to stop the killing is to spend more time talking, since when talking stops, fighting starts. He and Grudge revisit a scene from Grudge's past in which Grudge, a Navy commander, accompanied by his WAVE driver (Saint), visited a hospital in devastated Hiroshima and saw Japanese schoolchildren whose faces had been destroyed by the atom bomb.

Grudge walks through a door and meets the Ghost of Christmas Present (Hingle), who is feasting on an excessively large Christmas dinner on Grudge's dining table. This new Ghost turns on a light and shows Grudge that next to the dining room is an internment camp full of displaced persons from different nations who are poor, hungry, and lacking adequate shelter. These people search through the snow for food as the Ghost eats in front of them. When Grudge criticizes the Ghost for this behavior, the Ghost reminds Grudge of his earlier statement to Fred that refusing donations to the needy would make them less needy and more self-reliant. The Ghost harangues Grudge with statistics and information about needy people in the world and finally in a fit of anger pulls the tablecloth, dumping huge amounts of leftover food on the floor. Grudge cannot stand any more and runs away into the dark.

Grudge emerges into destroyed ruins that he recognizes as having been his local town hall, where he encounters the Ghost of Christmas Future (Shaw). This Ghost explains that the town hall was wrecked in a disastrous nuclear conflict that killed most of the world's people. A handful of survivors enter, led by a demagogue called "Imperial Me" (Sellers) who wears a Santa suit and a cowboy hat cut into a crown. The crowd cheers as Imperial Me is paraded in and gives a speech exhorting each person to act as an individual in their own self-interest. Grudge watches his butler, Charles (Rodriguez), try unsuccessfully to convince the crowd that acting collectively for the greater good of all is essential for humanity's survival. Imperial Me and the crowd mock Charles as crazy and beat him. Finally Imperial Me has Charles brought forward and charges him with treason. Charles tries to escape but is shot dead by a little boy in a cowboy outfit. Grudge's cook Ruby (Teer) weeps over Charles' body, while the crowd, led by Imperial Me, enthusiastically prepares to first kill the people across the river who had approached them wanting to talk, and then kill off each other until only one person is left. An agitated Grudge asks the Ghost if this is the world "as it must be, or as it might be", but the Ghost simply leaves without answering.

A shaken Grudge awakens back in the real world on Christmas morning, on the floor of his intact study with the phone in his hand. His nephew Fred appears and says that Grudge called him at 3 a.m. and asked him to stop by on his way to church. Grudge apologizes to Fred for his statements of the previous evening and, without explaining the reason for his change of heart, indicates cautious support for the United Nations and international diplomacy as a way to prevent future wars. Grudge further shows his new internationalism by enjoying a radio broadcast of the children of UN delegates singing Christmas carols in their native languages. Fred leaves and Grudge, rather than have Charles serve him on a tray as usual, goes into the kitchen to have his Christmas morning coffee with Charles and Ruby.

== Cast ==
Screenshot with Robert Shaw (right) as the ghost of Christmas future, and Sterling Hayden

- Percy Rodriguez as Charles
- Sterling Hayden as Daniel Grudge
- Ben Gazzara as Fred
- Barbara Ann Teer as Ruby
- Steve Lawrence as Ghost of Christmas Past
- Eva Marie Saint as WAVE Lt. Gibson
- James Shigeta as doctor
- Pat Hingle as Ghost of Christmas Present
- Robert Shaw as Ghost of Christmas Future
- Peter Sellers as Imperial Me
- Britt Ekland as mother

== Production ==
Carol for Another Christmas was the first in a series of television specials commissioned by the United Nations with the goal of educating viewers about the mission and work of the UN and thereby gaining more widespread support. (Six specials were originally planned, but only four were produced.) The nonprofit Telsun Foundation was formed to develop the programs, and Xerox agreed to contribute $4 million to underwrite the costs of production and air time, thus allowing the programs to be broadcast without commercial interruption.

The film was the only television work ever done by Mankiewicz, who, according to Phil Hall, was happy to have work following the damage done to his reputation by Cleopatra the previous year. The actors involved with the production reportedly agreed to waive their fees due to the nature and perceived importance of the program. Peter Sellers, who at the time was reported to charge $750,000 or more, appeared for only $350, the Screen Actors Guild weekly minimum.

Filming took place at the Michael Myerberg Studios located on Long Island, New York, during the fall of 1964. Henry Mancini wrote the theme music, also waiving his usual fee. It later appeared on his 1966 Christmas album A Merry Mancini Christmas.

Peter Fonda's scenes as Grudge's late son Marley were cut from the film prior to release, leaving only brief glimpses of Fonda reflected in a glass door and sitting mute at a table. However, Fonda's image remains in the film in the form of a large portrait of Marley hanging prominently in Grudge's study where several scenes take place. Although advance publicity articles listed Richard Harris, Godfrey Cambridge and Christopher Plummer among the cast, none of these actors appear in the finished film.

The main character was originally named Benjamin Grudge so that his name could be shortened to the pun "B. Grudge", but ABC viewed this as an insult to 1964 Republican Presidential candidate Barry Goldwater, whose initials were also B.G., and the character's name was changed to Daniel Grudge, while the broadcast was postponed until eight weeks after the election.

== Reception ==
Following its original 1964 broadcast, reviews were mixed. While some critics thought the program's lecturing style was appropriate to get its message across to a mass TV audience, others found it preachy, long-winded or dull. Variety described the program as "generalized to the extreme" and ultimately "a disappointment". The Los Angeles Times similarly expressed "disappointment" with the "windy, tedious play", complaining that it was "more tract than drama" and saying the opening scene between Grudge and Fred "sounded like the North Hollywood High School debating society and must have cost the play many a bored viewer who turned it off." Jack Gould in The New York Times went even further, calling Carol "a pretentious and wearing exercise in garrulous ineptitude, one of the more dismaying TV disappointments in several seasons." After receiving letters from viewers disagreeing with his review, Gould wrote a second opinion piece calling the film "condescending, pretentious and dull", "platitudinous propaganda", and "an exercise in heavy-handed sermonizing that the U.N. is good for you." The Washington Post printed a generally positive review, but wrote that the film "failed" because "[t]o most of the audience...the lesson that was being stressed has already been learned." Despite expressing dissatisfaction with the overall program, critics still praised the performances of some of the actors, particularly Sellers, Lawrence and Hingle.

Public reaction was mixed. Gould acknowledged in The New York Times that based on letters received, "many disagreed" with his sharp criticism of the film, in some cases suggesting that the program was "entitled to generous appreciation, if only because its espousal of the United Nations was so much more worthwhile than the average escapist Hollywood fare." However, according to Phil Hall, audiences disliked the film's heavy-handed approach. In addition, many right-wing viewers were fundamentally opposed not only to Carol but to the overall idea of television programs promoting the UN, and the John Birch Society had organized a letter-writing campaign against the film even before it was broadcast. Xerox, the sponsor, claimed to have received an approximately equal number of verified letters (about 6,000) for and against the UN film series.

Later, Carol's production supervisor, C.O. "Doc" Erickson, described the film as "overdone", saying, "It was too long, too tiring, and beat you over the head too much." Marc Scott Zicree, author of The Twilight Zone Companion (1982), has cited Carol as an example of Serling's more "didactic" writing. Serling biographer Gordon F. Sander noted that unlike much of Serling's screenwriting dealing with social change, Carol was depressing and did not end on an optimistic note, possibly because Serling in 1964 was influenced by the then-recent assassination of John F. Kennedy and the Johnson administration's escalation of U.S. involvement in the Vietnam War.

== Awards and honors ==
At the 17th Primetime Emmy Awards, despite the negative reviews, the film competed with nominations in two categories — Outstanding Program Achievements in Entertainment (Joseph L. Mankiewicz and ABC) and Best Art Direction or Scenic Design (Gene Callahan and Jack Wright), although it did not win in either category.

== Later rebroadcasts and releases ==
Following its initial ABC broadcast, Carol for Another Christmas was not rebroadcast for nearly five decades. During that time, the film was not commercially available, although it could be seen at the Paley Center for Media in New York and Los Angeles and the UCLA Film and Television Archive in Los Angeles. Some 16 mm prints were sold on the educational market, and bootlegs were also circulated. In 2000, clips from the film appeared in the David Leaf/John Scheinfeld documentary The Unknown Peter Sellers.

After 48 years, Carol for Another Christmas was finally rebroadcast when Turner Classic Movies (TCM) telecast it on December 16, 2012. Since then, TCM has aired the film annually in December and occasionally at other times, such as September 2015 in connection with a birthday tribute to Sellers and on April 16, 2024 in honor of Henry Mancini's 100th birthday. TCM has also made the film available for limited-time on-demand streaming via TCM.com. Until December 2021, the print used by TCM did not contain Mancini's theme and instead substituted a recording of children singing traditional carols. In December 2021, TCM aired a print in which the original theme music had been reunited with the film.

The film was released on DVD on December 13, 2016. In December 2021, it was available to stream on HBO Max. It is also available free on YouTube.

== See also ==
- United Nations television film series
- List of television films produced for American Broadcasting Company
- List of Christmas films
- Adaptations of A Christmas Carol
