= Astrid Bryan =

Belgian singer

Astrid Coppens
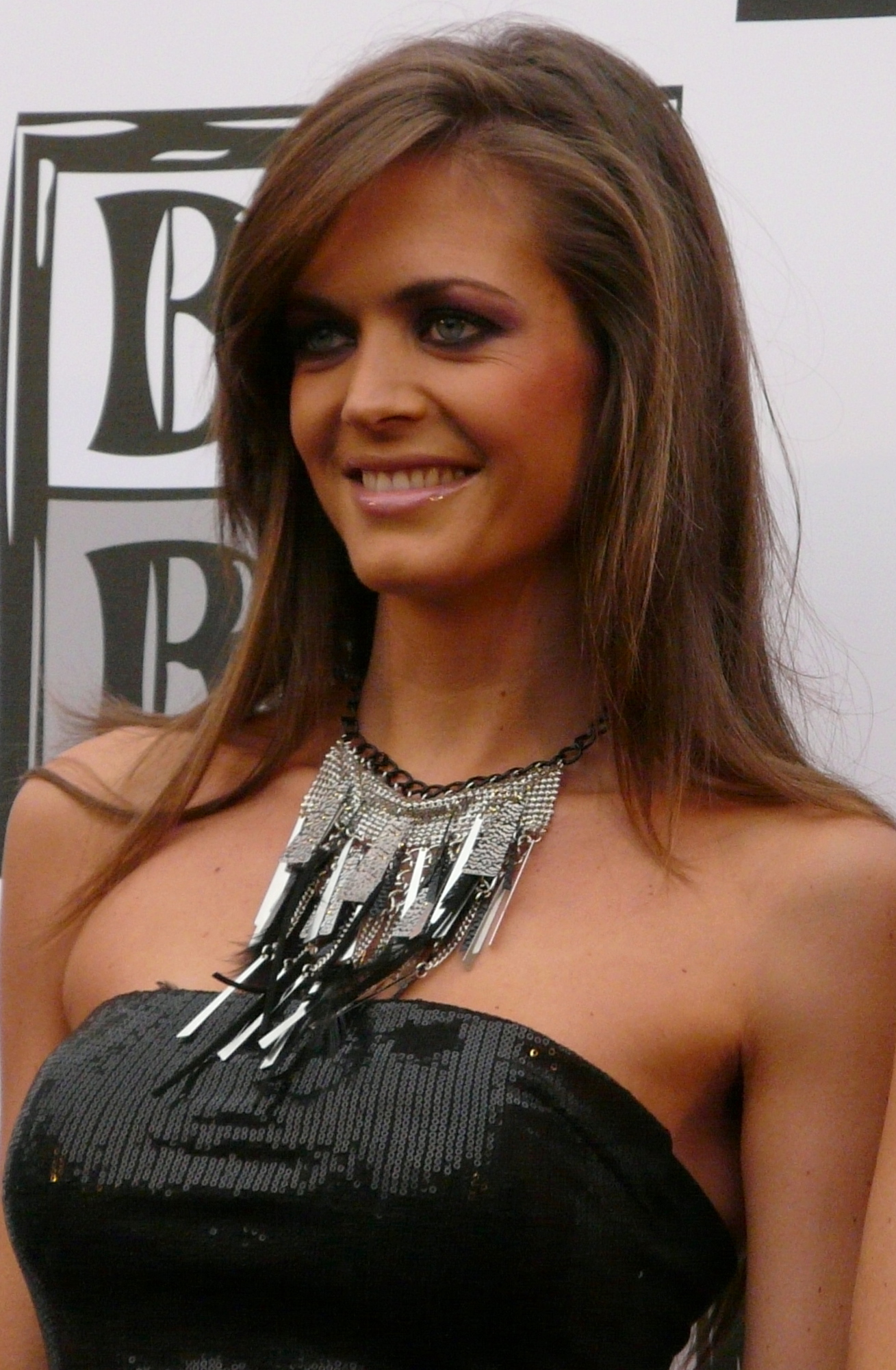
- Astrid Coppens in December 2011
- Born: Astrid Maria Maurice Nuyens; 25 January 1983 (age 43); Merksem, Flanders, Belgium
- Occupations: Singer-songwriter; model
- Years active: 1989–present
- Television: Astrid in Wonderland; Vlaamse Hollywood Vrouwen
- Height: 5 ft 10 in (1.78 m)
- Spouse: Bram Coppens
- Children: 2 daughters Billie-Ray and Joey-Lee
- Website: oneandonlyastrid.com

Astrid Coppens (born 25 January 1983) is a Flemish Belgian singer-songwriter and model.

== Career ==
=== Music ===
Astrid is a trained classical violinist. She started playing in 1987 at the age of 4, and subsequently appeared on various television shows and concert podia until 1998.

In 2008, Astrid launched a singing career with the song "You Know I Would" which she co-wrote and composed. The song was included on the soundtrack of the film The Pool Boys. Astrid's debut album as a singer, 'Taking Over', was released in 2009.

=== Model ===
Astrid signed with Dominique Models in Belgium and Next Models USA

=== Reality TV ===
In 2011, Astrid began starring in her own reality show called Astrid in Wonderland that aired for five seasons. The show first aired on 2 September 2011 on VijfTV. In 2012, Astrid in Wonderland got picked up in the Netherlands and is shown on the Dutch channel NET 5. In 2016 Astrid started filming on her new TV series "Astrid" that aired on VijfTV February 2017.

== Filmography ==
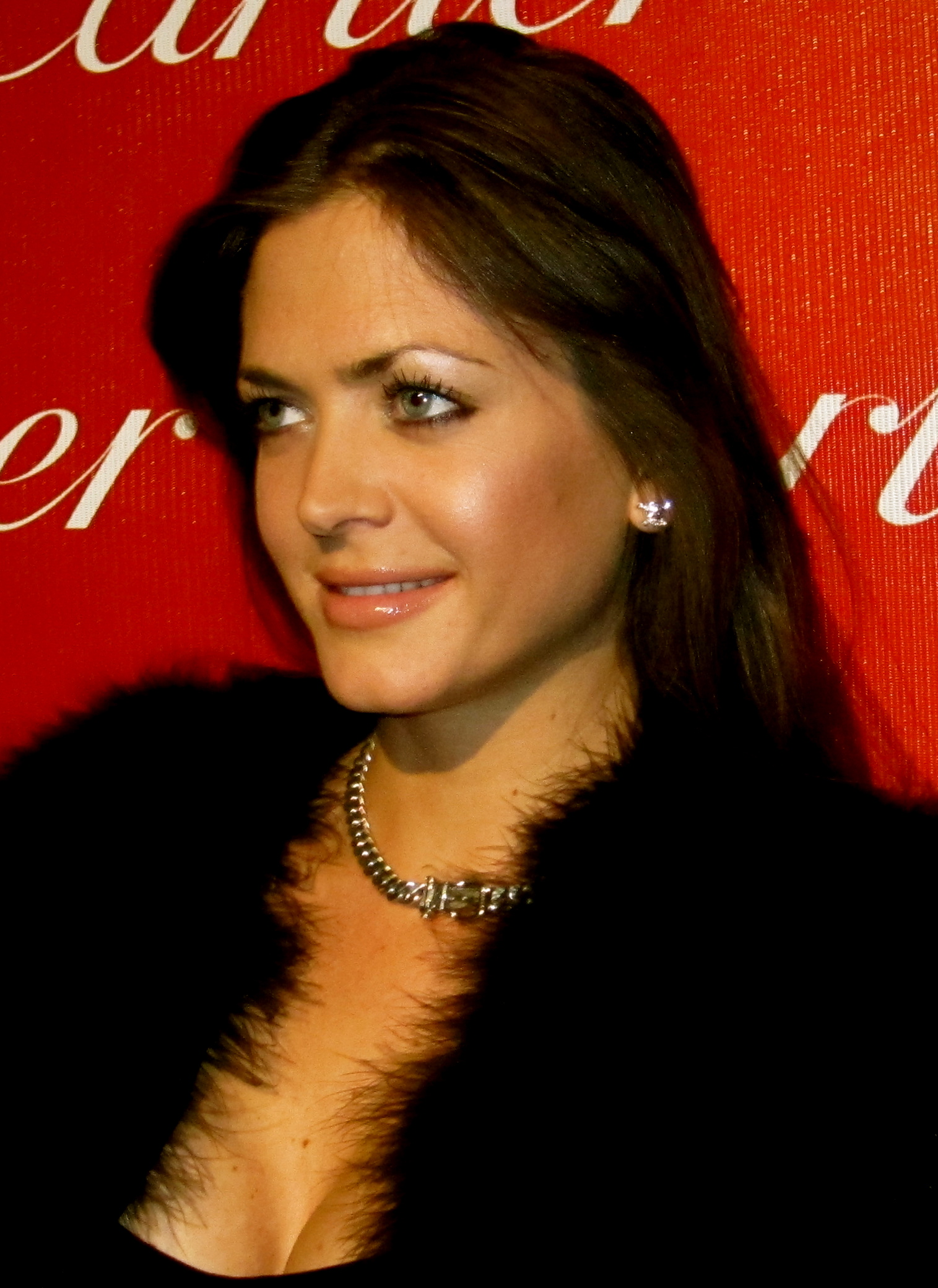
Bryan at the 2010 Palm Springs International Film Festival

=== Film ===
- 2017: Verborgen Verlangen as Louise Elsschot
- 2016: Broken Vows as Justine
- 2014: The Loft as Uninterested Girl
- 2012: The Bold and the Beautiful as Marie (Episode #6.312)
- 2011: The Pool Boys as Bachelorette Party Guest (uncredited)

=== Television ===
- 2016–2017: Astrid
- 2011–2013: Astrid in Wonderland
- 2011: Me Time
- 2011: Nederlandse Hollywood Vrouwen
- 2010: Vlaamse Hollywood Vrouwen

== Bibliography ==
- Amazing Astrid October 2012. Her book became a bestseller.
- Stylish Astrid December 2013.

== Fashion ==
She launched her own clothing and shoe line in May 2012. The entire collection sold out in less than two hours.

In June 2012, Astrid also launched her own fragrance, called Astrid in Wonderland, followed in October 2012 by her own nail polish by OPI Products. This makes her the first European celebrity to have an OPI line.

In September 2013 she became creative director of her own clothing line Astrid Black Label. It is currently sold in eighty stores in Belgium at the fashion chain ZEB.

== Personal life ==
Astrid married director Bram Coppens on 6 December 2016 on the island of Turks and Caicos. Previously she was married to John Bryan. She gave birth in Belgium to a daughter Billie-Ray on 28 June 2019. Astrid gave birth to her second daughter Joey-Lee on 24 October 2022.
