= The Poppy Is Also a Flower =

1966 television film by Terence Young

- Written by: Jo Eisinger
- Story by: Ian Fleming
- Directed by: Terence Young
- Starring: Senta Berger; Stephen Boyd; Yul Brynner; Angie Dickinson; Georges Géret; Hugh Griffith; Jack Hawkins; Rita Hayworth; Trevor Howard; Trini López; E. G. Marshall; Marcello Mastroianni; Amedeo Nazzari; Anthony Quayle; Gilbert Roland; Harold Sakata; Omar Sharif; Barry Sullivan; Nadja Tiller; Eli Wallach
- Music by: Georges Auric
- Countries of origin: France; Austria; United States
- Original language: English

Production
- Producer: Euan Lloyd
- Cinematography: Henri Alekan
- Editors: Monique Bonnot; Henry Richardson; Peter Thornton
- Running time: 80 minutes

Original release
- Network: ABC
- Release: 1966

The Poppy Is Also a Flower is a 1966 American-French-Austrian made-for-television spy and anti-drug film. It was originally made under the auspices of the United Nations as part of a series of television specials designed to promote the organization's work. The film was directed by Terence Young and stars Yul Brynner, Omar Sharif, Eli Wallach, Angie Dickinson, Senta Berger, Stephen Boyd, Trevor Howard, Jack Hawkins, Rita Hayworth and Marcello Mastroianni. Grace Kelly (as Princess Grace of Monaco) narrates.

The film was also known by alternative titles Poppies Are Also Flowers, The Opium Connection, and Danger Grows Wild (in the UK).

== Plot ==
In an attempt to stem the heroin trade at the Afghanistan–Iran border, a group of narcotics agents working for the United Nations inject a radioactive compound into a seized shipment of opium, in the hopes that it will lead them to the main heroin distributor in Europe.

== Cast ==
In alphabetical order

- Senta Berger as Maxine
- Stephen Boyd as Benson
- Yul Brynner as Col. Salem
- Angie Dickinson as Linda Benson
- Georges Géret as Supt. Roche
- Hugh Griffith as tribal chief
- Jack Hawkins as Gen. Bahar
- Rita Hayworth as Monique Markos
- Trevor Howard as Sam Lincoln
- Trini López as himself
- E. G. Marshall as Coley
- Marcello Mastroianni as Insp. Mosca
- Amedeo Nazzari as Capt. Dinonnio
- Anthony Quayle as Capt. Vanderbilt
- Gilbert Roland as Serge Markos
- Harold Sakata as Martin
- Omar Sharif as Dr. Rad
- Barry Sullivan as Chasen
- Nadja Tiller as Dr. Bronovska
- Eli Wallach as "Happy" Locarno

== Production ==
The film is based on an idea by Ian Fleming, the James Bond creator. Funded in part by a grant from Xerox, it was produced by the United Nations and the stars received a salary of $1. Terence Young left the direction of Thunderball to make the film.

One of the props from Thunderball features in the beginning of the film - the underwater watch provided to James Bond (Sean Connery) by Q (Desmond Llewelyn), with a built-in Geiger Counter which in the former film is meant to detect a nuclear weapon, and in this production to permit long-range tracking of drug shipments which contain a radioactive marker.

Part of the production of this film took place overseas. Iran was the main setting for many desert and border scenes. The crew spent several weeks on location and the local cinematographers joined the team to accomplish the production. Famous Iranian cinematographers cooperated with this project, including Maziyar Partow.

The Poppy Is Also a Flower was the last of four television movies commissioned by the United Nations, to publicize its missions and roles in world peace and diplomacy. The film was originally 80 minutes in length for its ABC telecast, minus commercial time for the 90-minute slot. It was expanded to 100 minutes for a US theatrical release by Astral Films in 1967.

After its television broadcast on ABC in 1966, Eli Wallach won an Emmy Award for Best Supporting Actor at the 19th Primetime Emmy Awards, for his portrayal of drug kingpin "Happy" Locarno. This was the production's only award.

== See also ==
- List of American films of 1966
- List of television films produced for American Broadcasting Company
- United Nations television film series
