= The Bobo =

1967 British film by Robert Parrish

- Theatrical release poster
- Directed by: Robert Parrish; Peter Sellers (uncredited)
- Written by: David R. Schwartz
- Based on: Play by David R. Schwartz Novel Olimpia by Burt Cole
- Produced by: Jerry Gershwin; Elliott Kastner
- Starring: Peter Sellers; Britt Ekland; Rossano Brazzi; Adolfo Celi
- Cinematography: Gerry Turpin
- Edited by: John Jympson; Pamela Tomling
- Music by: Francis Lai
- Distributed by: Warner-Pathé Distributors (UK); Warner Bros. Pictures (USA)
- Release date: 28 September 1967 (U.S.)
- Running time: 103 minutes
- Country: United Kingdom
- Language: English
- Budget: $3 million or £1.117 million

The Bobo is a 1967 British comedy film starring Peter Sellers and Britt Ekland. Directed by Robert Parrish, it was written by David R. Schwartz, based on the 1959 novel Olimpia by Burt Cole, also known as Thomas Dixon.

== Plot ==
Juan Bautista, an out- of- work and untalented singing matador, is offered a break by a theater manager if he will seduce Olimpia, a beautiful but exploitative tease who has gotten the better of his benefactor. He does so, in part by singing her a song about the "girl from Barcelona". Once she has succumbed to his advances, she finds out about his deception. In revenge, she and her maid find a way to get him into a bathtub of blue dye, which turns him dark blue.

== Cast ==
- Peter Sellers as Juan Bautista
- Britt Ekland as Olimpia Segura
- Rossano Brazzi as Carlos Matabosch
- Adolfo Celi as Francisco Carbonell
- Hattie Jacques as Trinity Martinez
- Ferdy Mayne as Silvestre Flores
- Kenneth Griffith as Pepe Gamazo
- Al Lettieri as Eugenio Gomez
- Marne Maitland as Luis Castillo
- John Wells as Pompadour Major Domo
- Don Lurio as Ramon Gonzales
- Antonia Santiago Amador (La Chana) as flamenco dancer

== Production ==
=== Original novel and play ===
The film was based on the 1959 novel Olimpia by Burt Cole. The New York Times wrote that "the author does have an ability to see with imagination and occasionally literary artistry. What he lacks ... is not flamboyance, but a story with substance."

In 1961 it was announced that David R. Schwartz had written a theatre adaptation titled The Bobo, with former Moss Hart assistant Joseph Hyman slated to produce, Norman Jewison to direct and Diane Cilento and Shelley Berman to star. Jewison said: "It's not a slick comedy. It's a little different and much fresher." In 1962, Caroline Swan was named as producer, but the play never materialised.

=== Development ===
In August 1962, George Cukor announced that he would produce a film based on the book starring Ava Gardner.

In May 1966, it was announced that film rights to the play were owned by the team of Eliot Kastner and Jerry Gershwin, who had recently produced Harper and Kaleidoscope for Warner Bros. They signed a deal with Peter Sellers to star in the film and possibly direct it. In August 1966, it was announced that Sellers' wife Britt Ekland would appear in the film as the first of a five-film contract with Gershwin. Eventually, Sellers decided not to direct and Robert Parrish took the job.

=== Shooting ===
Filming took place in Italy and Barcelona in August 1966 and at Cinecittà Studios, Rome. It was a difficult shoot, as Sellers and Ekland were having marital problems and Sellers' mother died during filming. Sellers insisted on directing some of the film.

== Soundtrack ==
"Imagine," the song heard with the titles, was written by Francis Lai, with lyrics by Sammy Cahn. It was released as a single by Stan Kenton and His Orchestra, by Dana Valery as a B-side to "You" and by John Gary as a B-side to "Cold", all in 1967. British singer Petula Clark also recorded it in 1967 for her album These Are My Songs. She performed the tune on ABC's Hollywood Palace.

== Critical reception ==
Contemporary reviews were mixed. The Monthly Film Bulletin wrote:

A remarkably unfunny comedy. Peter Sellers gives an equivocal performance as the mongrel hero – part clown, part singer, part lover – that leaves one constantly aware of the discrepancy between the intended effect and the one actually achieved. When his redrimmed eyes stare soulfully out from a cerulean face, we sense that we are meant to be moved – as by Keaton or Chaplin – but are merely embarrassed; and the same is true – though this time an analogy with Jerry Lewis would be more appropriate – of the scene where his singing, which a little earlier had made both us and the impresario wince, is supposed to touch Olimpia's granite heart. But in context his performance acquires an almost heroic stature. Kenneth Griffith – embodying the film's fundamental principle that additional sibilants are all it takes to establish a Spanish atmosphere – is conspicuously bad, and Britt Ekland, whom Robert Parrish relies upon almost entirely to provide the visual interest, provides very little else. Only John Wells, as the poovy Maitre d'Hotel in Louis XV costume, emerges with his professional reputation undamaged. The photography is remarkable for the poor lighting of the studio exteriors and for a repetitive shot of Olimpia's admirers taken through the distorting lens of the peep-hole on her apartment door. Nonetheless, the scene in which she all but makes love to her new Maserati is not without interest.

In another contemporary review for The New York Times, critic Bosley Crowther wrote: "[A]fter sitting dutifully through it, I can tell you what a bobo is. It's a booboo – and that goes not only for the title character, played by a strangely lackluster Mr. Sellers, but also for the film. It's amazing how labored and unfunny is the screenplay of this pseudocomic tale."

Richard Schickel wrote in Time: "There comes a time in the life of every screen comedian when he urgently feels the need to have the adjective 'Chaplinesque' applied to his work. It is a dangerous moment, with the pitfall of pretentiousness yawning on one side, sentimentality on the other and all the psychological hazards of overreaching buzzing in the back of the mind. It is a pleasure to report that Peter Sellers – that excellent fellow – has not only endured this trial, but has mostly prevailed over it."
