= Moon in Scorpio =

- Theatrical release poster
- Directed by: Gary Graver
- Written by: Robert S. Aiken
- Produced by: Alan Amiel
- Starring: Britt Ekland; John Phillip Law; William Smith; Lewis Van Bergen; Jillian Kesner; April Wayne
- Cinematography: Gary Graver
- Edited by: Omer Tal
- Music by: Robert O. Ragland
- Production company: Trans World Entertainment
- Distributed by: Trans World Entertainment; Emerald Films
- Release date: October 14, 1987
- Running time: 90 minutes
- Country: United States
- Language: English

Moon in Scorpio is a 1987 American horror film directed by Gary Graver. and starring Britt Ekland, John Phillip Law, and William Smith.

== Plot ==
Newly married couple Linda and Allen plan to take a trip to Acapulco for their honeymoon. Joining them on the cruise are Burt, the owner of the yacht, his wife, Claire, along with an additional couple Mark and his wife, Isabel. Burt and Mark are Vietnam War veterans and friends of Allen. Prior to the yacht leaving the harbor, a marina employee is stabbed to death by a mysterious figure in black pajamas.

The couples meet on the boat and set sail. During the voyage, wartime flashbacks show the three men committing atrocities during their tour of duty in Vietnam, including the murdering of innocent villagers. The men are clearly troubled by this and tensions on the ship, some of which are sexual, begin to rise. Soon, the boat is vandalized, rendering some of the navigation and communications equipment inoperable. Isabel begins acting erratically and mentions several times that when the “moon is in scorpio”, bad things happen. In a short period of time, Mark, Burt and Claire are gruesomely killed, leaving only Linda, Allen, and Isabel as the survivors. Allen is killed later; as Linda looks for him on the yacht, she surprises Isabel who is in possession of the murder weapon, an odd-shaped grappling hook.

Isabel tries to kill Linda and the two women fight each other. The fight ends when Linda overpowers Isabel and stabs her to death with the grappling hook. The entire story is told via flashbacks, from Linda's point of view, as she is the only survivor. The movie opens with an unseen person escaping from a mental institution and Linda in a hospital being comforted by a doctor. The movie closes with Linda being released from the hospital after she has narrated her story to the police.

== Cast ==
- Britt Ekland as Linda
- John Phillip Law as Allen
- William Smith as Burt
- Lewis Van Bergen as Mark
- April Wayne as Isabel
- Robert Quarry as Dr. Khorda
- Jillian Kesner as Claire
- Don Scribner as Richard Vargas

== Production ==
In an on-line documentary, Graver explained the difficulties in making the picture for less than $250,000 and how those difficulties were exacerbated by a two week filming schedule. Graver, who died in 2006, also explained how the executive producer, Moshe Diamant, continually interfered with the project and significantly altered Robert Aiken’s screenplay. The original story line described how the veterans had burned down a Vietnamese temple dedicated to a “snake goddess” and that years later, a young Vietnamese child came to the United States to exact revenge on the soldiers. Diamant believed the story line was too confusing and instead demanded that Graver make a mad slasher movie, similar to Halloween but set on a yacht. The result, according to Graver, was some of both, but mostly confusion. Worse, Graver explained, after he went on vacation following the conclusion of the editing, Diamant hired another editor to re-arrange the scenes, creating yet more confusion. Graver claimed that Moon in Scorpio was the only project he ever worked on that made him want to “get into a fistfight.” Although the movie was never released theatrically, Graver claimed it made the producers more than a $1,500,000 profit from video sales and TV and cable showings.

== Reception ==
Moon in Scorpio received mostly negative reviews from critics. TV Guide awarded the film one out of five stars, stating that there were only a few elements in the film that made it worth a look. Charles Tatum from eFilmCritic also gave the film one out of five stars, panning the film's script, acting, and cinematography, writing "Moon in Scorpio is proof positive that anyone can make a film if they have the money, and anyone did a lousy job of it here." Eric Cotenas of DVD Drive-In also criticized the film's performances, as well as the film's "incessant narration".

”From the jumbled structure, it's apparent that the movie was heavily re-edited to the point of incomprehensibility. I got the impression that Graver and screenwriter Robert Aiken originally intended the movie to be a supernatural thriller, with the veterans' past literally coming back to haunt them (either through the ghosts of the villagers they massacred, or through possession of one of the boaters). However, whatever ghostly [or] … zombie elements there may have been, they have been completely removed. The prologue and the hospital sequences were obviously tacked on afterwards, both to provide a "rational" explanation for the murders and to pad out the running time. I'm not sure whether Graver himself helmed any of the framing-sequence footage, or whether it was handled by co-producer Fred Olen Ray...in any case, the result is a mess.”
