= Satan's Mistress =

Dark Eyes
- Theatrical release poster
- Directed by: James Polakof
- Written by: Beverly Johnson; James Polakof
- Produced by: Beverly Johnson; Michelle Morgan; William H. Parker; James Polakof; Gary Rollason; John J. Smith
- Starring: Lana Wood; Britt Ekland; Kabir Bedi
- Cinematography: James L. Carter
- Edited by: George Trirogoff
- Music by: Roger Kellaway
- Distributed by: Motion Picture Marketing
- Release date: June 1982
- Running time: 98 min.
- Country: United States
- Language: English

Satan's Mistress (also known as Demon Rage, Fury of the Succubus and Dark Eyes) is a 1982 horror film, produced, co-written and directed by James Polakof. It concerns a sexually frustrated housewife, Lisa (Lana Wood), who, having become distanced from her husband Carl (Don Galloway), begins having nightly trysts with a tall, dark stranger who turns out to be a ghost (Kabir Bedi).

The film gives bigger screen credit to Britt Ekland, who has only a minor role but possessed more star power, having previously played Mary Goodnight in The Man with the Golden Gun. Lana Wood is known to many as Plenty O'Toole from the James Bond film Diamonds Are Forever, while Kabir Bedi was featured as the villain's henchman, Gobinda, in yet another James Bond film, Octopussy. The film also contains a cameo role for veteran horror actor John Carradine, as Father Stratten.

The film was released the same year as the similarly themed The Entity, differing from it in that the sex in Satan's Mistress is consensual.

== Cast ==
- Britt Ekland – Ann-Marie
- Lana Wood – Lisa
- Kabir Bedi – the spirit
- Don Galloway – Carl
- John Carradine – Father Stratten
- Sherry Scott – Michelle
- Elise-Anne – Belline
- Tom Hallick – Burt
