= The Walls Came Tumbling Down (film) =

1946 film by Lothar Mendes

- Directed by: Lothar Mendes
- Screenplay by: Wilfred H. Petitt
- Based on: The Walls Came Tumbling Down by Jo Eisinger
- Produced by: Albert J. Cohen
- Starring: Lee Bowman; Marguerite Chapman; Edgar Buchanan; George Macready
- Cinematography: Charles Lawton Jr.
- Edited by: Gene Havlick
- Music by: Marlin Skiles
- Production company: Columbia Pictures
- Distributed by: Columbia Pictures
- Release date: June 7, 1946
- Running time: 82 minutes
- Country: United States
- Language: English

The Walls Came Tumbling Down is a 1946 American mystery film noir crime film directed by Lothar Mendes and starring Lee Bowman, Marguerite Chapman, Edgar Buchanan and George Macready. Produced and distributed by Columbia Pictures, it was based in the 1943 novel of the same title by Jo Eisinger. Both book and film take their title from the hymn Joshua Fit the Battle of Jericho. Its plot bears similarities to that of The Maltese Falcon as several different figures hunt for a mysterious, lost treasure.

== Plot ==
When the body of a man who was a childhood mentor to him is found apparently having committed suicide, newspaper gossip columnist Gilbert Archer is unconvinced and begins to hunt for the potential murderer. He is intrigued by an attractive young woman who called at the dead man's residence shortly after his body was discovered, but she is able to avoid his investigations. The mystery is added when Archer is then approached twice by parties wishing him to get them two bibles connected with the dead man and willing to pay large sums to secure it.

Gradually Archer is able to thread the case together. The bibles contain clues that may lead to the hiding place of a long missing artwork - a lost masterpiece by Leonardo da Vinci depicting the biblical Fall of Jericho. The priceless painting had once belonged to the young lady's grandfather while the others chasing after it are prepared to resort to further violence - as they prove when they commit another murder.

== Cast ==
- Lee Bowman as Gilbert Archer
- Marguerite Chapman as Patricia Foster, AKA Laura Browning
- Edgar Buchanan as George Bradford
- George Macready as Matthew Stoker
- Lee Patrick as Susan
- Jonathan Hale as Captain Griffin
- J. Edward Bromberg as Ernst Helms
- Elisabeth Risdon as Catherine Walsh
- Miles Mander as Dr. Marko
- Moroni Olsen as Bishop Martin
- Katherine Emery as Mrs. Stoker
- Noel Cravat as Rausch
- Arthur Loft as Anderson
- Larry Steers as Johnson
- Francis Pierlot as Father Walsh
- Mary Field as Bradford's Secretary
- Wanda Perry as Marco's Secretary

== Bibliography ==
- Blottner, Gene. Columbia Noir: A Complete Filmography, 1940-1962. McFarland, 2015.
- Spicer, Andrew. Historical Dictionary of Film Noir. Scarecrow Press, 2010.
