= The Rover (1967 film) =

- Directed by: Terence Young
- Screenplay by: Jo Eisinger
- Based on: The Rover by Joseph Conrad
- Produced by: American Broadcasting Company
- Starring: Anthony Quinn; Rosanna Schiaffino; Rita Hayworth; Richard Johnson
- Cinematography: Leonida Barboni
- Edited by: Peter Thornton
- Music by: Ennio Morricone
- Distributed by: Cinerama Releasing Corporation
- Release date: 1967
- Running time: 103 minutes
- Budget: $1,325,000
- Box office: $295,000

L'avventuriero (internationally released as The Rover) is a 1967 Italian war-drama film directed by Terence Young and starring Anthony Quinn. It is based on the 1923 novel The Rover written by Joseph Conrad.

== Cast ==
- Anthony Quinn as Peyrol
- Rosanna Schiaffino as Arlette
- Rita Hayworth as Caterina
- Richard Johnson as Real
- Ivo Garrani as Scevola
- Mino Doro as Dussard
- Luciano Rossi as Michel
- Mirko Valentin as Jacot
- Giovanni Di Benedetto as Lt. Bolt
- Anthony Dawson as Capitain Vincent

== Production ==
The film was one of a number of collaborations between Terence Young and Richard Johnson.

== Reception ==
The film performed disappointingly at the box office, earning $225,000 in rentals internationally and $70,000 domestically. According to ABC records, it suffered an overall loss of $1,595,000.
