= Lana Wood =

American actress (born 1946)

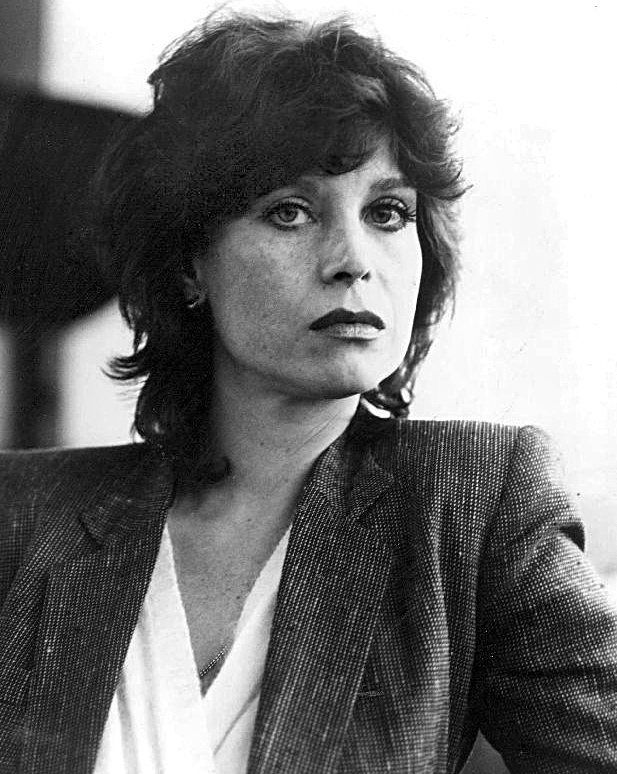
- Wood in 1982
- Born: Svetlana Lisa Gurdin; March 1, 1946 (age 80); Santa Monica, California, U.S.
- Occupations: Actress; producer
- Years active: 1947–present
- Known for: Diamonds Are Forever; Peyton Place; The Long, Hot Summer
- Spouses: Jack Wrather Jr. (m. 1962; ann. 1963) Karl Brent (m. 1964; div. 1965) Stephen Oliver (m. 1966; ann. 1966) Stanley William Vogel (m. 1968; div. 1968) Richard Smedley (m. 1972; div. 1976) Allan Balter (m. 1979; div. 1980)
- Partner: Alan Feinstein (1980s)
- Children: 1
- Relatives: Natalie Wood (sister); Robert Wagner (brother-in-law); Natasha Gregson Wagner (niece)

Lana Wood (born Svetlana Lisa Gurdin; March 1, 1946) is an American actress and producer. She made her film debut in The Searchers as a child actress and later achieved notability for playing Sandy Webber on the TV series Peyton Place and Plenty O'Toole in the James Bond film Diamonds Are Forever. Her sister was Natalie Wood.

== Early life ==
Wood was born Svetlana Lisa Gurdin to Russian émigrés, Marusia Zoudilova (1908 (Note: Wood's mother was born on January 26, 1908, according to the earliest available records. Sometime in the mid-1930s, she shaved four years off her age—giving her birthdate as February 8, 1912, perhaps because her fiancé was younger—and maintained this lie for the rest of her life.)–1998), also known as Mary Tatuloff, Marie Tatuloff or Maria Gurdin, and Nicholas Zacharenko (1912–1980). They had each left Russia as child refugees with their parents following the Russian Civil War, and they grew up far from their homeland. Her father's family left Vladivostok after her grandfather, a chocolate-factory worker who joined the anti-Bolshevik civilian forces, was killed in a street fight in 1922; they settled in Vancouver, British Columbia, with their relatives, then moved to San Francisco. Lana's maternal grandfather owned soap and candle factories in Barnaul; he left Russia with his family in 1918 after his eldest son was killed by the Red Army, and settled in a Russian community in Harbin, China. Maria married Armenian mechanic Alexander Tatuloff there in 1925, and they had a daughter, Olga Viripaeff (1928–2015), before divorcing in 1936.

When Nicholas and Maria married in February 1938, she brought her daughter Olga, then known as Ovsanna, to the household, sharing joint custody with her ex-husband in El Cerrito, California. The couple had two daughters together; the first was Natalie, known as "Natasha", the Russian diminutive. The family settled in Santa Monica, near Hollywood, and changed their surname to Gurdin. Svetlana, known as "Lana", was born there. RKO executives David Lewis and William Goetz changed the surname of her elder sister, making her Natalie Wood, after she started her acting career as a child. She was named after director Irving Pichel's friend Sam Wood. When Lana made her film debut in The Searchers (1956), her mother was asked under what last name Lana should be credited. Maria agreed to use "Wood" for Lana, building on Natalie's recognized work.

Through her paternal cousin Kaisaliisa Zacharenko, Wood is distantly related by marriage to baseball player Tim Lincecum.

== Career ==
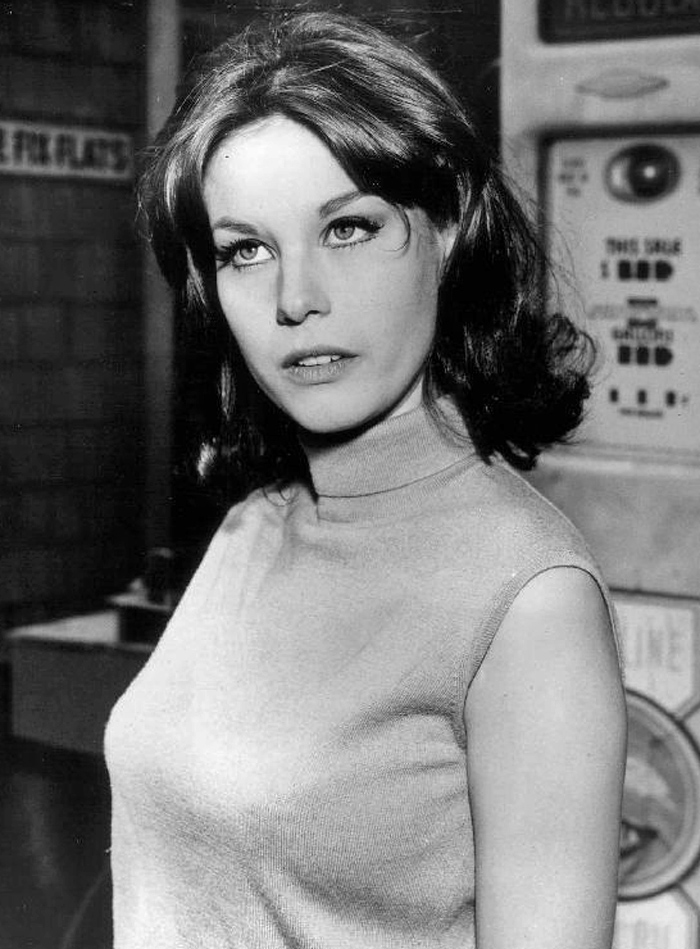
Wood in 1966

In her early career, Wood usually performed in films in which Natalie appeared. Starting in the 1960s, her own career took off. After appearing on the short-lived drama series The Long, Hot Summer, she landed the role of Sandy Webber on the soap series Peyton Place. She played the role from 1966 to 1967. She turned down the Karen Black role in Easy Rider (1969), a decision she now cites as the worst mistake she has made in her career. She was cast as a Bond girl, Plenty O'Toole, in the James Bond film Diamonds Are Forever (1971). In 1970, Wood was approached by Hugh Hefner and she agreed to pose for Playboy. The Playboy pictures appeared in the April 1971 issue, along with Wood's poetry.

Wood has more than 20 other films and over 300 television series episodes to her credit, including The Fugitive, Bonanza, Mission: Impossible, Wild Wild West, Police Story, Starsky & Hutch, Nero Wolfe, Fantasy Island, and Capitol. After appearing in the horror film Satan's Mistress (1982), she retired from acting, concentrating on her career as a producer, but since 2008 she has returned to acting in a number of low-budget films. Wood is a character in the Steve Alten book Meg: Hell's Aquarium (2009).

She has written two autobiographies, Natalie: A Memoir by Her Sister (1984) and Little Sister: My Investigation Into the Mysterious Death of Natalie Wood (2021), in which she claimed veteran actor Kirk Douglas sexually assaulted her sister Natalie when she was just 16.

== Personal life ==
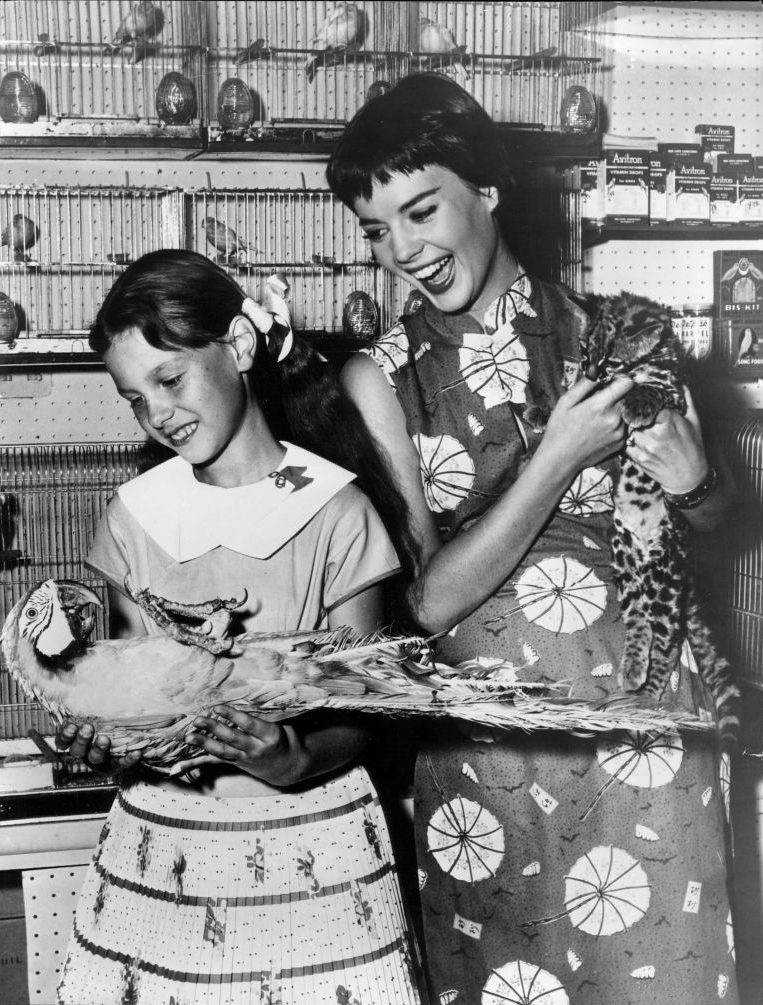
Wood with her sister Natalie in 1956

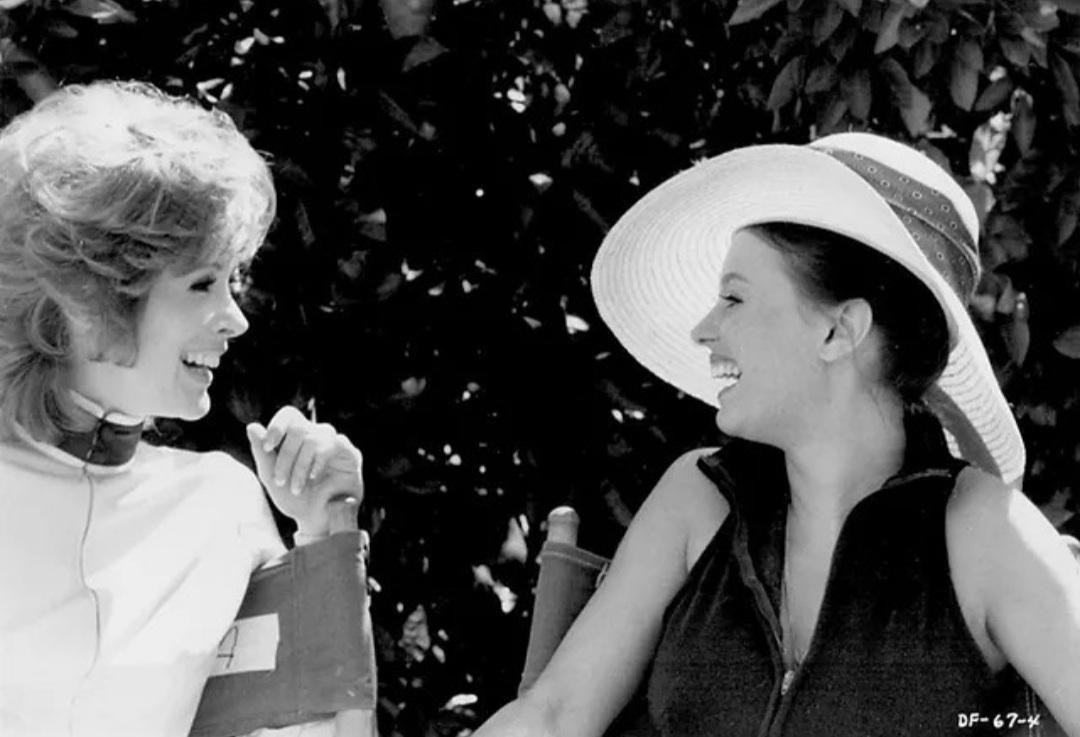
With Jill St. John in 1971; Wood has since questioned whether this photo is real

Wood has been married six times:

1. Jack Wrather Jr. – (1962–1963; annulled when she was 16 years old)
2. Karl Brent – (1964–1965; divorced)
3. Stephen Oliver – (1966–1966; annulled)
4. Dr. Stanley William Vogel (1968–1968; divorced)
5. Richard Smedley – (1972–1976; divorced) one child, Evan Taylor Smedley Maldonado (August 11, 1974 – July 18, 2017), by whom she has three grandchildren.
6. Allan G. Balter (1979–1980; divorced)

Between marriages, Wood dated actors Dean Stockwell, Adam West, Eddie Fisher, Warren Beatty, Sean Connery, Alain Delon and Ryan O'Neal, as well as talent agent Guy McElwaine, producer Jerome Hellman and composer Leslie Bricusse. For most of the 1980s she was in a relationship with Alan Feinstein.

Wood's sister Natalie was married to actor Robert Wagner until her drowning death on November 29, 1981. She has long been at odds with both Wagner and his third wife Jill St. John, her feud with the latter dating back to when both appeared in Diamonds Are Forever. Wood is totally estranged from her nieces, Natasha Gregson and Courtney Wagner, who failed to attend the funeral of their maternal grandmother Maria Gurdin in 1998, and responded with silence when their cousin Evan Maldonado died in 2017.

== Filmography ==
=== Film ===
Year	Title	Role	Notes
1947	Driftwood	Infant	Scene cut
1954	There's No Business Like Show Business	Little Laughing Girl	Uncredited
1955	One Desire	Little Girl	Uncredited
1956	The Searchers	Debbie Edwards	
1958	Marjorie Morningstar	Girl	Uncredited
1962	Five Finger Exercise	Mary	
1965	The Fool Killer	Alice	
1965	The Girls on the Beach	Bonnie	
1968	For Singles Only	Helen Todd	
1969	Scream Free!	Karen	aka Free Grass
1970	Black Water Gold	Eagan Ryan	
1970	The Over-the-Hill Gang Rides Again	Katie Flavin	
1971	Diamonds Are Forever	Plenty O'Toole	
1972	Justin Morgan Had a Horse	Kathleen	
1972	A Place Called Today	Carolyn Schneider	
1974	Goodnight Jackie	Jackie	
1975	Who is the Black Dahlia?	Boarder	
1975	Sons of Sassoun	Hasmig	
1976	Nightmare in Badham County	Smitty	
1977	Little Ladies of the Night	Maureen	
1977	Speedtrap	New Blossom	
1977	Grayeagle	Beth Colter	
1977	Corey: For the People	Janet Hanley	
1978	A Question of Guilt	Elizabeth Carson	
1979	Captain America II: Death Too Soon	Yolanda	
1982	Satan's Mistress	Lisa	
2008	Divas of Novella	Zeld	
2009	The Book of Ruth: Journey of Faith	Tani	
2010	War of Heaven	President Bailey	
2010	Deadly Renovations	Dr. Nitas	
2010	Last Wish	Helen	
2013	The Executive	Margo Steel	
2014	Donors	Norma	
2015	Bestseller	Marta	
2016	Killing Poe	Dean Wood	
2016	Subconscious Reality	Implicit	
2017	Operation: Assassination	Lana Wood	
2018	Wild Faith	Opal	
2018	Invasion	Lana Wood	
2019	The Marshal	Ms. Darling	Original Title: Bill Tilghman and the Outlaws
2020	Alone	Maria Clemm	
2021	The Sand Dollar Suicide	Cordelia Cozzi	
2021	Drunk and Roudy	Edith	Original Title: Best Years Gone
2022	Bestseller 2	Marta	
2022	Dog Boy	Vera Summers	
TBA	Race to Judgment	Sofia Jacalone	
TBA	Virtue	Celia Lovell	

=== Television ===
Year	Title	Role	Notes
1957	Judgment at Nuremberg	Judy	Episode: "Winter Dreams"
1958	Alcoa Theatre	Pat	Episode: "The Victim"
1958	Judgment at Nuremberg	Evie Gray	Episode: "Point of No Return"
1958	Have Gun – Will Travel	Becky Coldwell	Episode: "The Teacher"
1958	The Real McCoys	Marilyn Harwick	Episode: "The New Neighbors"
1964	Dr. Kildare	Judy Gaer	Episode: "Man Is a Rock"
1964	Wendy and Me	Millie	Episode: "George Burns While Rome Fiddles"
1964	The Fugitive	The Doll	Episode: "Detour on a Road Going Nowhere"
1965–1966	The Long, Hot Summer	Eula Harker	23 episodes
1966–1968	Peyton Place	Sandy Webber	80 episodes
1967	The Wild Wild West	Sheila O'Shaughnessy	Episode: "The Night of the Firebrand"
1967	Bonanza	Dana Dawson	Episode: "The Gentle Ones"
1969	Felony Squad	Sherry Martin	Episode: "The Last Man in the World"
1969	The Wild Wild West	Averi Trent	Episode: "The Night of the Plague"
1971	Marcus Welby, M.D.	Angie	Episode: "Don't Kid a Kidder"
1971	O'Hara, U.S. Treasury	Fran Harper	Episode: "O'Hara, U.S. Treasury"
1971	Monty Nash	Diana	Episode: "Code Name: Diana"
1972	Disneyland	Kathleen	2 episodes
1972	Night Gallery	Maid	Episode: "You Can't Get Help Like That Anymore"
1972	Mission: Impossible	Marcy Carpenter	Episode: "The Deal"
1973	Police Story	June Lang	Episode: "Countdown: Part 2"
1974	QB VII	Sue Scanlon	Episode: "Part One & Two"
1976	Starsky & Hutch	Ella	Episode: "Running"
1976	Baretta	Sister Olive	Episode: "Shoes"
1977	Police Story	Rene	Episode: "Ice Time"
1978	Police Story	Gloria	Episode: "No Margin for Error"
1978	Fantasy Island	Cecile	Episode: "Fool for a Client/Double Your Pleasure"
1978	The Next Step Beyond	Peg Enright	Episode: "Ghost of Cellblock Two"
1979	David Cassidy: Man Undercover	Pearl	Episode: "Death Is a Close Friend, Too"
1979	Starsky & Hutch	Sidney 'Sid' Archer	Episode: "Ninety Pounds of Trouble"
1979,1981	Big Shamus, Little Shamus	Unknown	2 episodes
1981	Nero Wolfe	Delia Brandt	Episode: "Might as Well Be Dead"
1983	Capitol	Fran Burke	Unknown episodes
1984	The Fall Guy	Lana Wood	Episode: "Always Say Always"
1985	The New Mike Hammer	Virginia Warburton	Episode: "Deadly Reunion"
2009	Tales from Dark Fall	Santi	Episode: "The Last Laugh"

== Awards and nominations ==
Year	Association	Category	Nominated work	Result
1966	Photoplay Awards	Most Promising New Star (Female)		Nominated
2019	Burbank International Film Festival	Best Faith Based Film	Wild Faith	Won
2019	Christian Media Association Film Contest	Best Justice-Racism / Discrimination	Wild Faith	Won
2022	Bare Bones International Film and Music Festival	Best Comedy	Drunk and Roudy	Nominated
2022	Bare Bones International Film and Music Festival	Best Romance	Drunk and Roudy	Nominated
2022	Maverick Movie Awards	Best Picture	Drunk and Roudy	Won

== Bibliography ==
- Wood, Lana (1984). Natalie Wood: A Memoir by Her Sister. New York: G.P. Putnam's Sons. ISBN 0-399-12903-0.
- Finstad, Suzanne (2001). Natasha: The Biography of Natalie Wood. New York: Three Rivers Press. ISBN 978-0609809570.
