= Vlaamse Hollywood Vrouwen =

- Genre: Reality
- Starring: Astrid Bryan, Nora Novak, Greet Ramaekers and Linda Op De Beeck
- Country of origin: Belgium
- Original languages: Dutch and English
- No. of seasons: 1
- No. of episodes: 9

Production
- Production location: Los Angeles
- Camera setup: Single camera

Original release
- Network: VTM
- Release: 13 October 2010

Vlaamse Hollywood Vrouwen is Belgian reality television series airing on VTM that premiered on 13 October 2010.

== Overview ==
Starring : Astrid Bryan, Nora Novac, Greet Ramaekers en Linda Op De Beeck
