= Who Has Seen the Wind? =

- Based on: The Land Bird by Tad Mosel
- Directed by: George Sidney
- Starring: Stanley Baker; Theodore Bikel
- Country of origin: United States
- Original language: English

Production
- Budget: $400,000

Original release
- Release: February 19, 1965

Who Has Seen the Wind? is a 1965 television film directed by George Sidney and starring Stanley Baker. It was made under the auspices of the United Nations as part of the United Nations television film series. It originally aired on the American Broadcasting Company (ABC) on 19 February 1965.

== Cast ==
- Maria Schell as Maria Redek
- Theodore Bikel as Josef Radek
- Veronica Cartwright as Kiri Radek
- Stanley Baker as Janos
- Edward G. Robinson as Captain
- Gypsy Rose Lee as Proprietress
- Victor Jory as Peraltor
- Paul Richards as Father Aston
- Simon Oakland as Inspector
- Lilia Skala as Nun

== See also ==
- United Nations television film series
- List of television films produced for American Broadcasting Company
