= The Rover (novel) =

1923 novel by Joseph Conrad

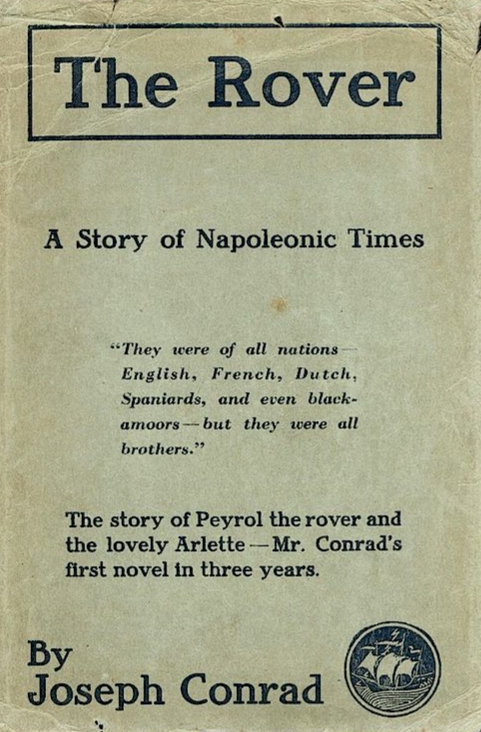
First edition (US) (publ. Doubleday, Page & Co.)

The Rover is the last complete novel by Joseph Conrad, written between 1921 and 1922. It was first published in 1923, and adapted into the 1967 film of the same name.

Modern critique of the novel is mixed: many critics find worth in it, but do not consider it one of Conrad's better novels.

== Plot summary ==
The story takes place in the south of France, against the backdrop of the French Revolution, Napoleon's rise to power, and the French-English rivalry in the Mediterranean. Peyrol (a master-gunner in the French republican navy, pirate, and for nearly fifty years "rover of the outer seas") attempts to find refuge in an isolated farmhouse (Escampobar) on the Giens Peninsula near Hyères.

The story is about Peyrol's attempt at withdrawal from an action- and blood-filled life; his involvement with the pariahs of Escampobar; the struggle for his identity and allegiance, which is resolved in his last voyage.

The plotline involving Escampobar is a retelling of the tale of Acis and Galatea. The young maiden Arlette, is made to marry the murderer of her parents, Scevola; Scevola desires to kill Peyrol after mistaking him for Réal, his rival in love for Arlette.

== Epigraph ==
Conrad placed on the title page an epigraph taken from Edmund Spenser's The Faerie Queene:

Sleep after toyle, port after stormie seas,
Ease after warre, death after life, does greatly please

This also became Conrad's epitaph.
