= Astrid in Wonderland =

2011 Belgian reality television series

- Genre: Reality
- Directed by: Maria Lise Van Lente
- Starring: Astrid Bryan
- Countries of origin: Belgium, Netherlands
- Original language: English (Dutch subtitles)
- No. of seasons: 5
- No. of episodes: 50

Production
- Executive producer: Astrid Bryan
- Producers: Astrid Bryan, Julie Van Beek
- Production location: Los Angeles
- Camera setup: Single camera

Original release
- Network: VIJFtv
- Release: 2 September 2011 – 2013

Astrid in Wonderland is a Belgian reality television series airing on the Belgian channel VIJFtv and in the Netherlands on NET5 and was first on air on 2 September 2011.

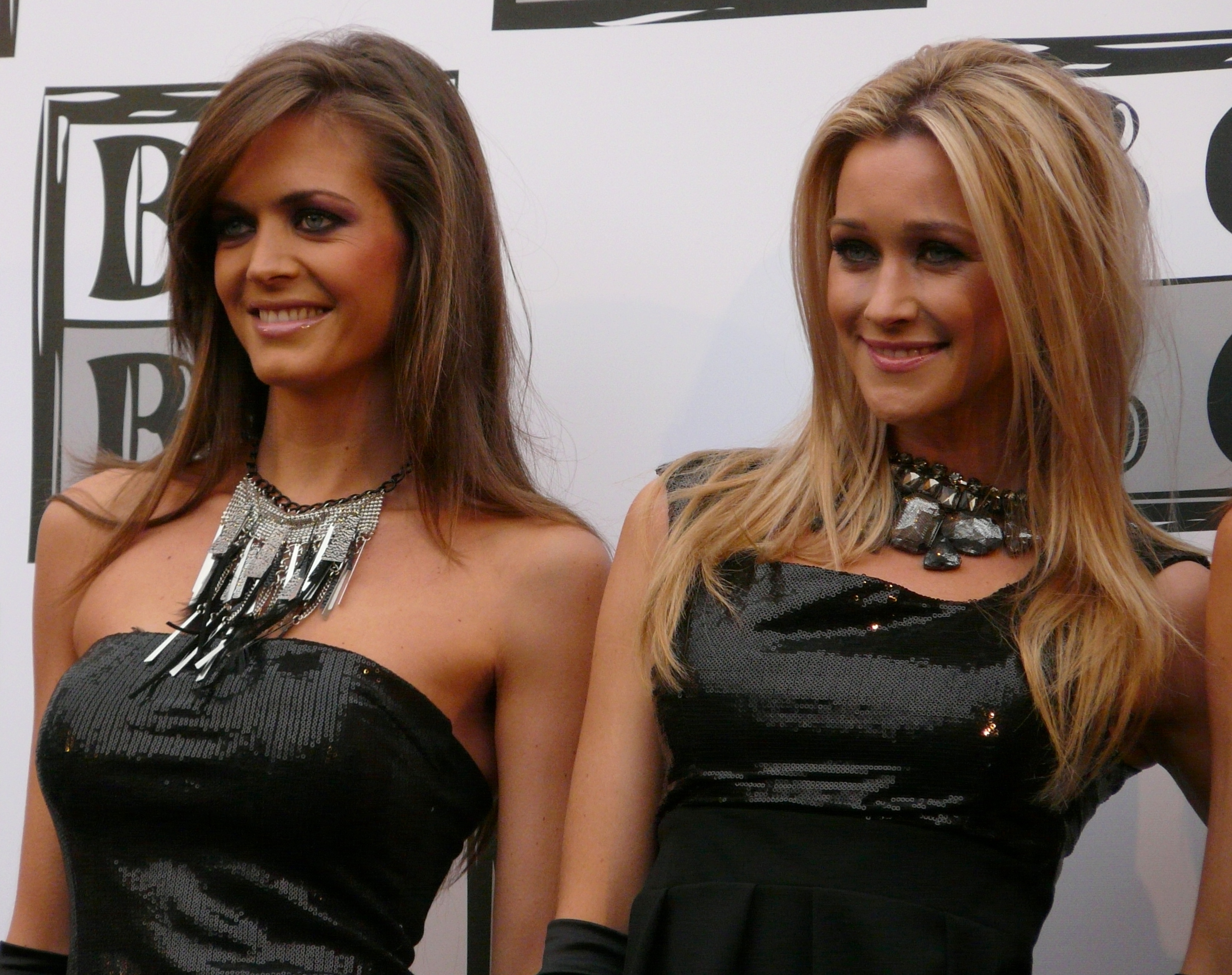
Astrid Bryan (left) and Kim Engelbosch

== Overview ==
Starring:

- Astrid Bryan (Astrid Maria Maurice Nuyens Bryan Jr.)
- Laurens Nuyens: brother of Astrid
- A. John A. Bryan Jr.
- Kathryn Lebowitz
- NancyJane Goldston
- Bart Cops
- Kate Gaffney
- Jaden Huter
- Corina Marinescu
- Ashlee McNulty
