= Heveadorp =

- Village
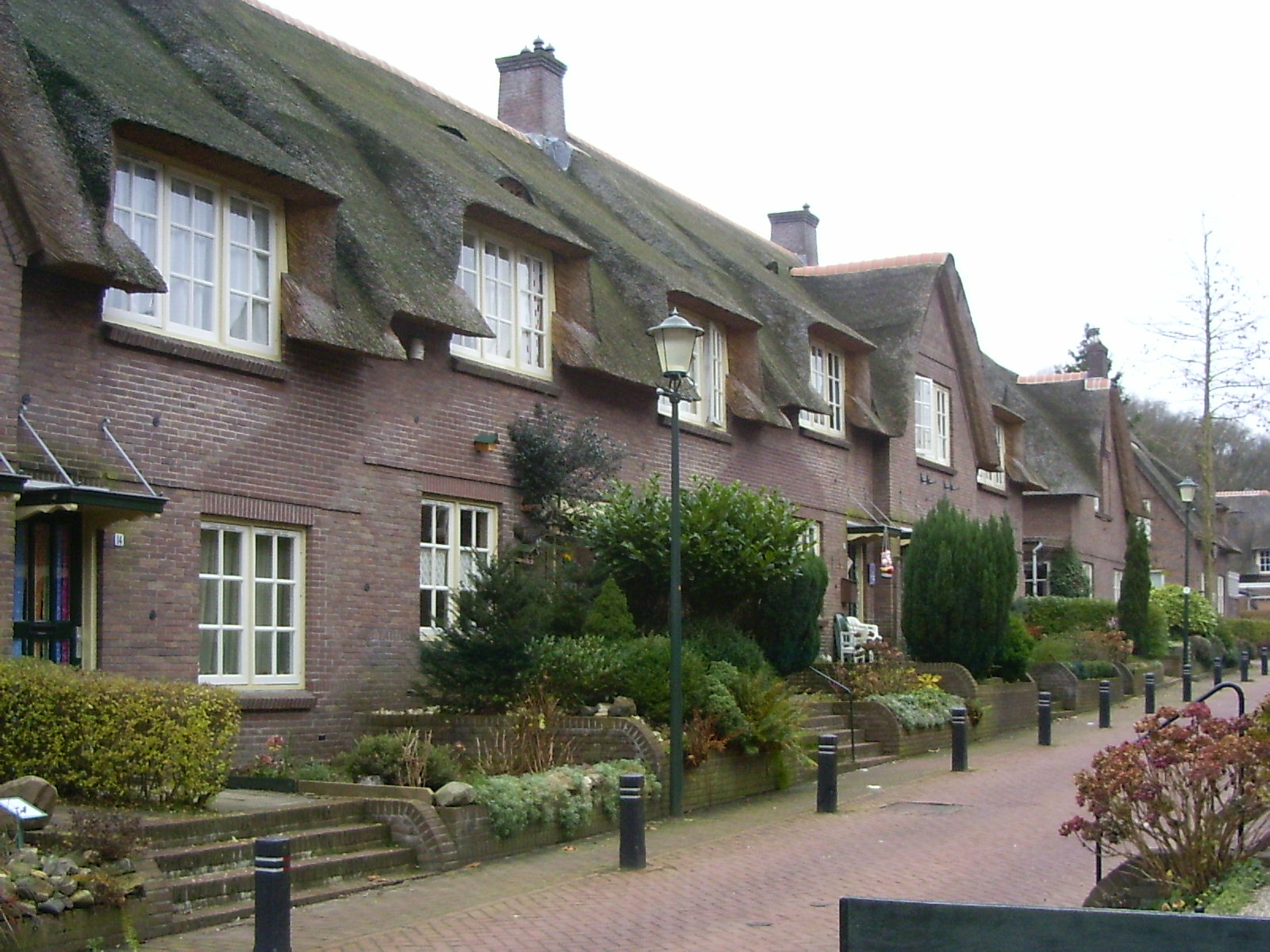
- Street in Heveadorp

- Location in the Netherlands Heveadorp (Netherlands)
- Coordinates: 51.97502°N 5.80961°E
- Country: Netherlands
- Province: Gelderland
- Municipality: Renkum

Area
  - Total: 0.56 km^{2} (0.22 sq mi)
- Elevation: 27 m (89 ft)

Population (2021)
  - Total: 720
  - Density: 1,300/km^{2} (3,300/sq mi)
- Time zone: UTC+1 (CET)
  - Summer (DST): UTC+2 (CEST)
- Postal code: 6869
- Dialing code: 026

Heveadorp (Dutch pronunciation: [ɦeːˈveːaːdɔr(ə)p]) is a model village near Doorwerth in the municipality of Renkum, Gelderland, the Netherlands. The village is situated in a valley surrounded by forest. The creek Seelbeek runs through the village.

Heveadorp was founded in 1916 by Dirk Frans Wilhelmi as a company town for the workers of his rubber factory Heveafabriek. Hevea is the scientific name for the rubber plant.

During the German occupation of the Netherlands the factory was used for war purposes. During Operation Market Garden, the factory and village were severely damaged. In 1962, Heave merged with Apollo Vredestein and the factory was moved to Renkum in 1975. The 400 villagers who remained, refused to leave the village. In 2009, it was officially recognised as a village.

== Gallery ==
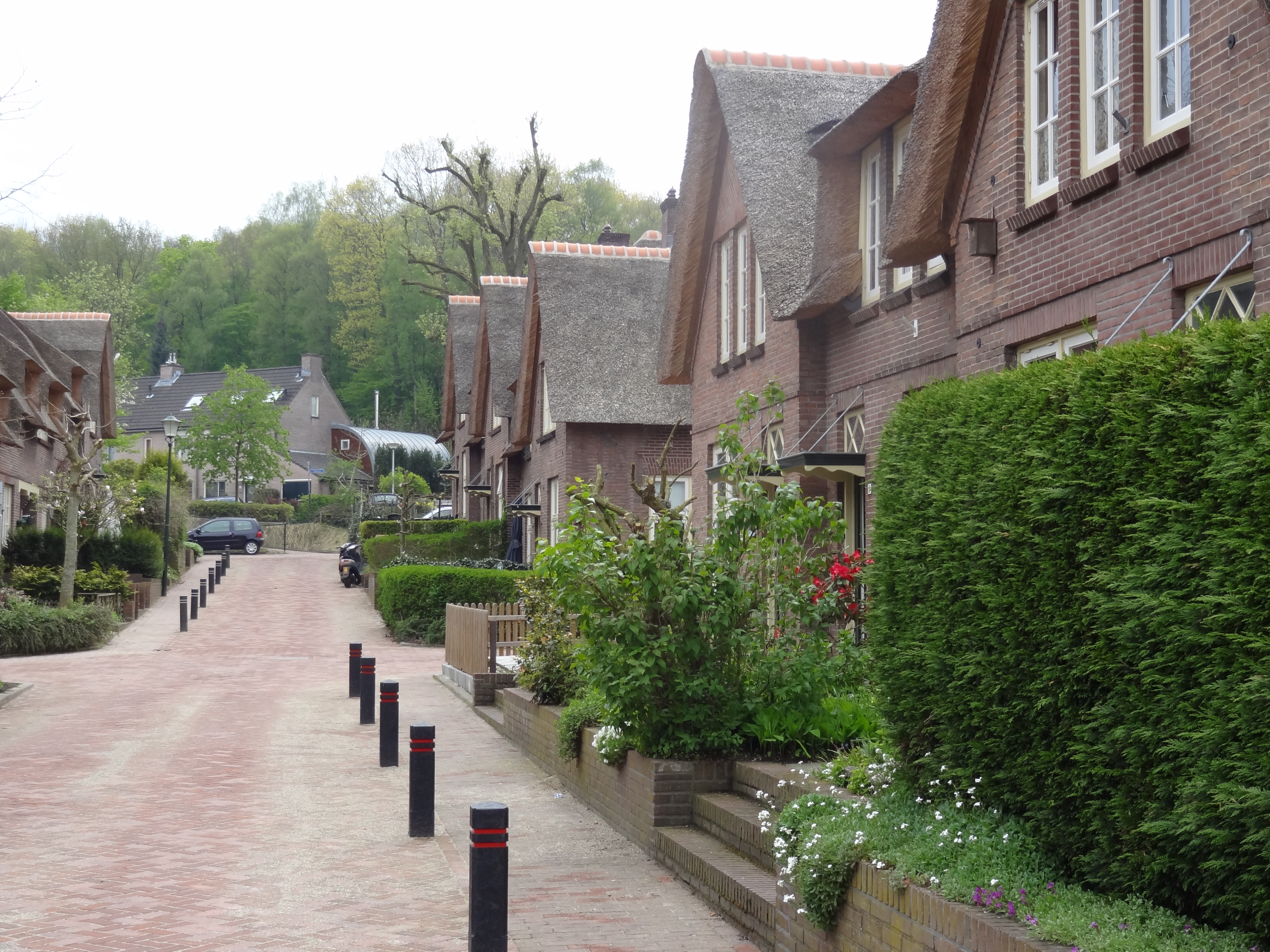
Typical houses in Heveadorp

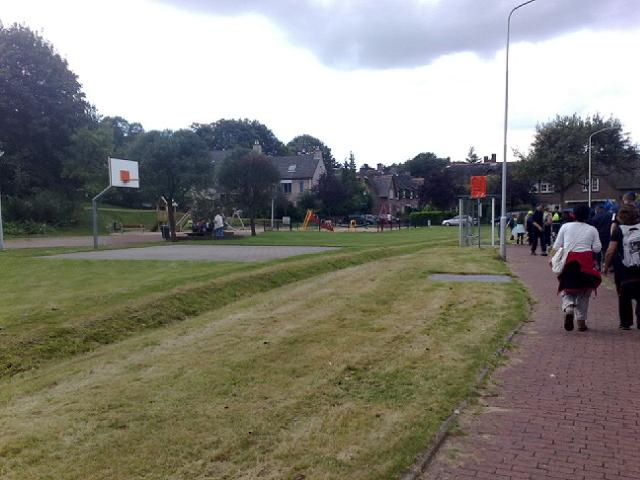
Typical houses in Heveadorp

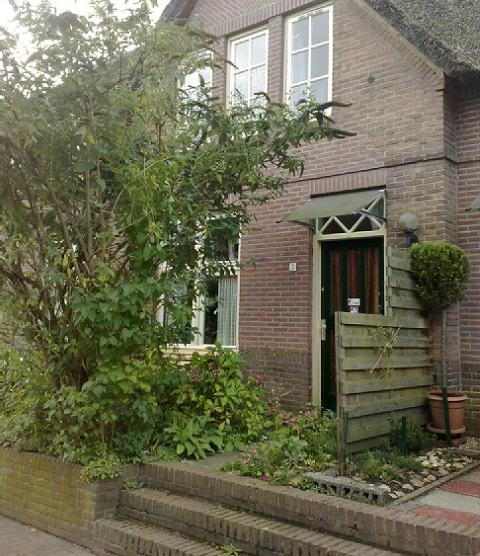
Typical houses in Heveadorp
