= Airborne March =

Dutch commemorative event

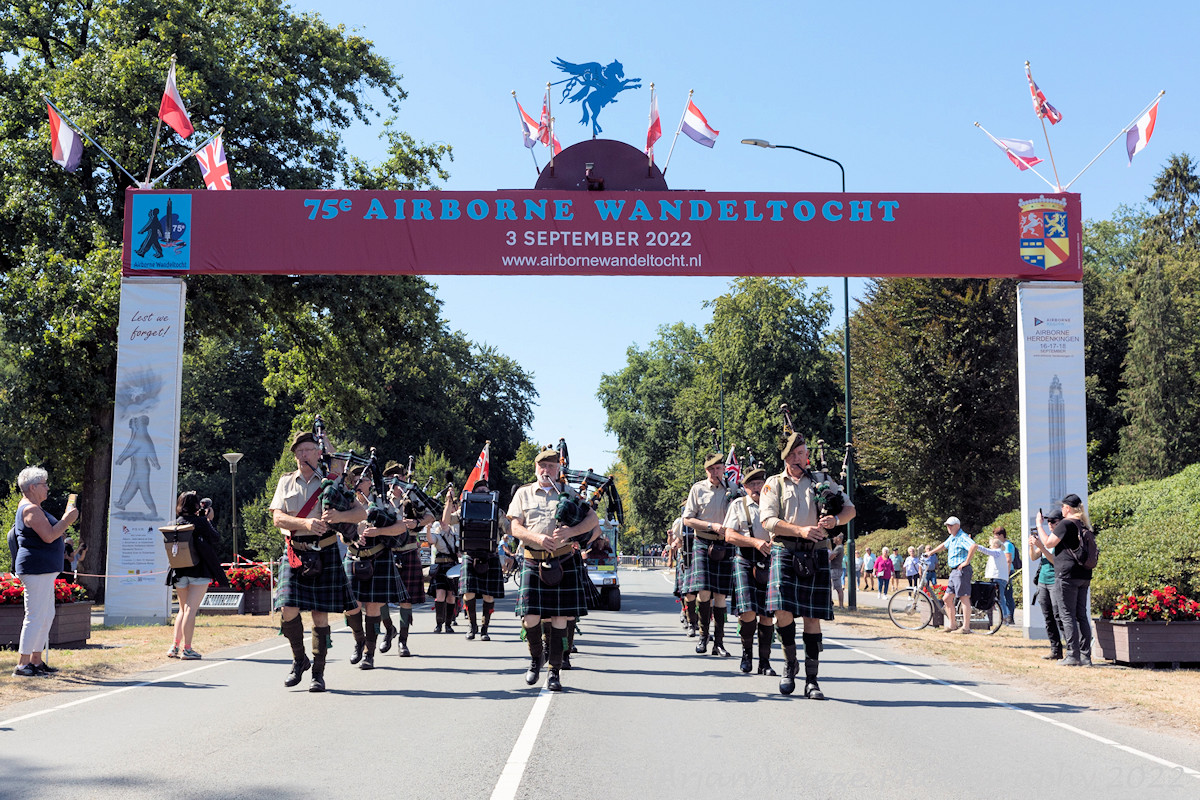
- Official name: Airborne Wandeltocht
- Observed by: Netherlands
- Date: First Saturday in September
- 2025 date: September 6
- 2026 date: September 5
- 2027 date: September 4
- 2028 date: September 2
- Frequency: annual

The Airborne March is the annual Dutch commemorative event in remembrance of the Battle of Arnhem in September 1944, that began in 1947 and always takes place on the first Saturday in September at Oosterbeek near Arnhem in The Netherlands. Just over 34,800 people took part in the 68th edition of the march in 2014.

The march is one of several events attended by veterans, living relatives, soldiers and British army cadets plus RAF and air cadets from the United Kingdom together with Dutch military, police and civilians to commemorate the 1,750 British and Polish soldiers and airmen who died at the Battle of Arnhem during the Second World War and who are buried at the Airborne Cemetery at Oosterbeek. The march is also meant to remind one and all, especially the post-war generations, of the sacrifices man was ready to make for the restoration of democracy.

In 1947 the Police Sports Association 'Renkum' Organised the 'Airbornewalk' for the first time, to honour those who fought for our freedom enduring the September days in 1944, in and around Oosterbeek and Arnhem. Over 2,000 participated in this first march, so it was a success from the beginning. Later the event was named 'Airborne March', with the permission of Major-General Roy Urquhart, CB, DSO, commander of the 1st Airborne Division, whereby the Pegasus emblem could be used by the organization.

From the beginning the net revenues of the Airborne March are used to enable veterans and next of kin with poor means, to come over to The Netherlands and attend the annual Airborne-commemorations in and around Arnhem. As of 2011 other charities are supported, provided that they are in accordance with the ideology of the Airborne March and comply with the policy's rules and regulations.

The Airborne March has 4 distances: 10, 15, 25 and 40 km. The longest distance is for individuals only. The routes lead you through the woods of the Veluwezoom and the municipality of Renkum and the great views over the river Rhine. Over 17 nationalities participate in this march every year; individuals as well as groups. The groups normally choose the longer distances.

It is organised every year at the sports park Hartenstein in Oosterbeek, just beyond the Airborne Museum, the former Hartenstein Hotel, which was used as Divisional H.Q. by Major General Roy Urquhart CB, DSO at the time of the battle.

The routes lead past the most important wartime locations in the Oosterbeek area:

- the former Hartenstein Hotel, which was the Divisional H.Q. at the time of the battle and is now the Airborne Museum
- the Airborne Cemetery, where over 1,700 British and Polish soldiers are buried
- the dropzones on the Ginkel Heath near Ede
- the vast woods of the "Bilderberg" where troops fought a hard battle
- the drop and landing zones of Wolfheze, Renkum, Heelsum and Ginkel Heath near Ede.
- the Old Church where troops gathered during the retreat

At least 10,000 British Army, Air Force and Navy Cadets have attended in the last 25 years and have experienced battlefield tours and many other educational events during their stay.

In 2016 the march celebrated its 70th Jubilee Edition and 36.191 participants from more than 20 countries joined. This was a new record.

In 2020 the march was cancelled for the first time in its existence, due to COVID-19 measures.

In 2021 the march was cancelled again for the same reason as in 2020.

== Pictures ==
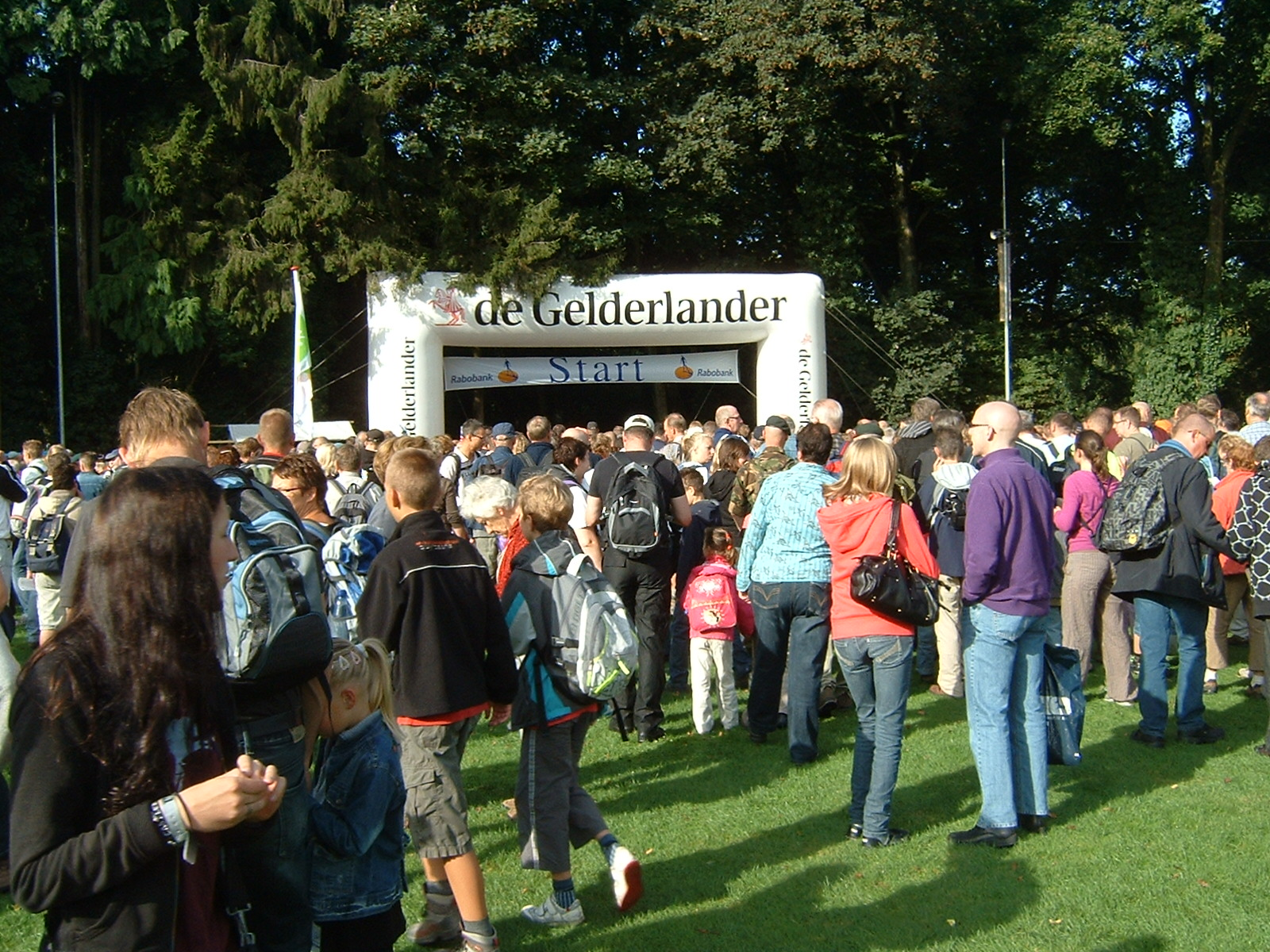
Start of the 2009 Airborne March

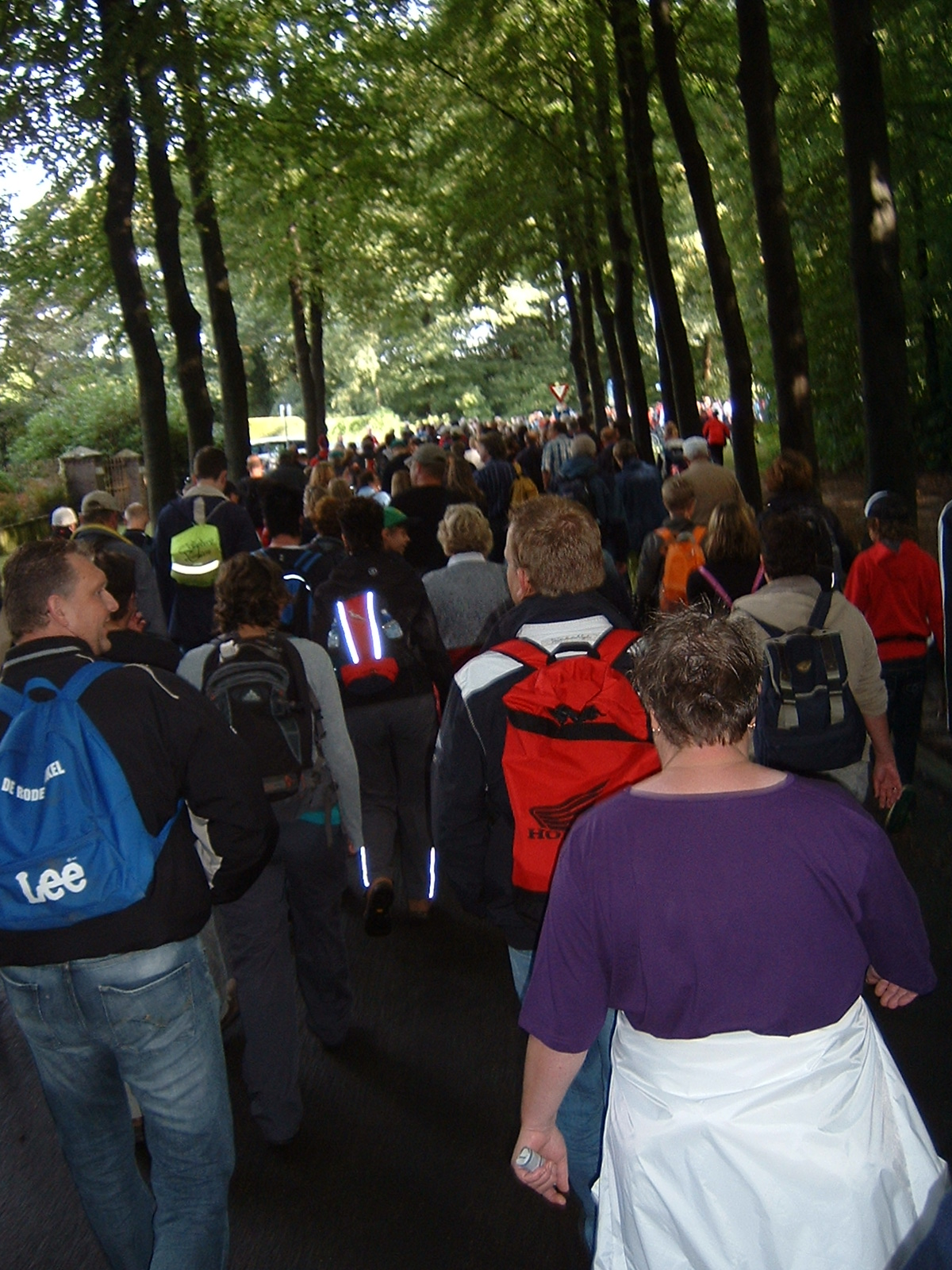
Offroad track

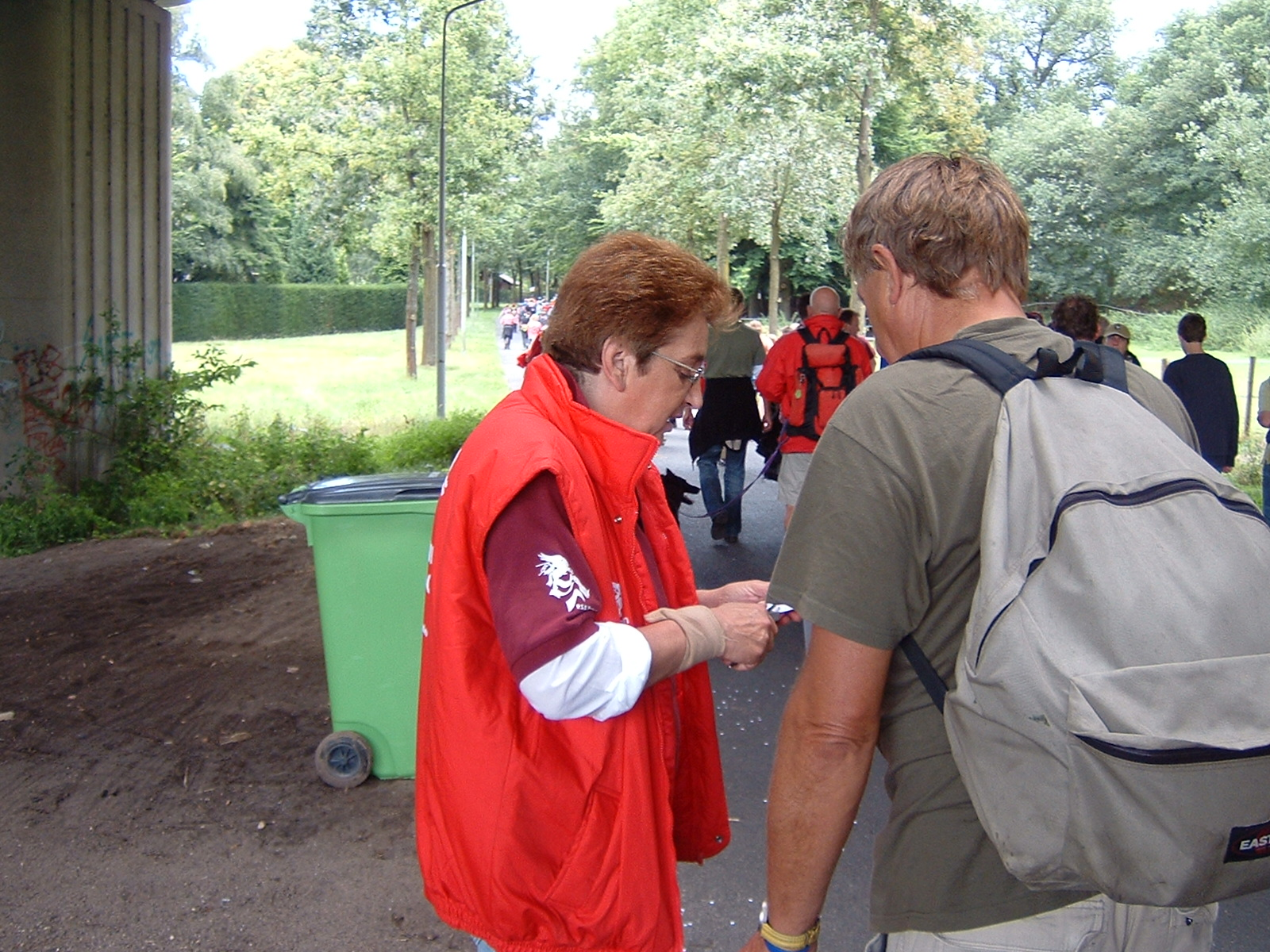
Checkpoint

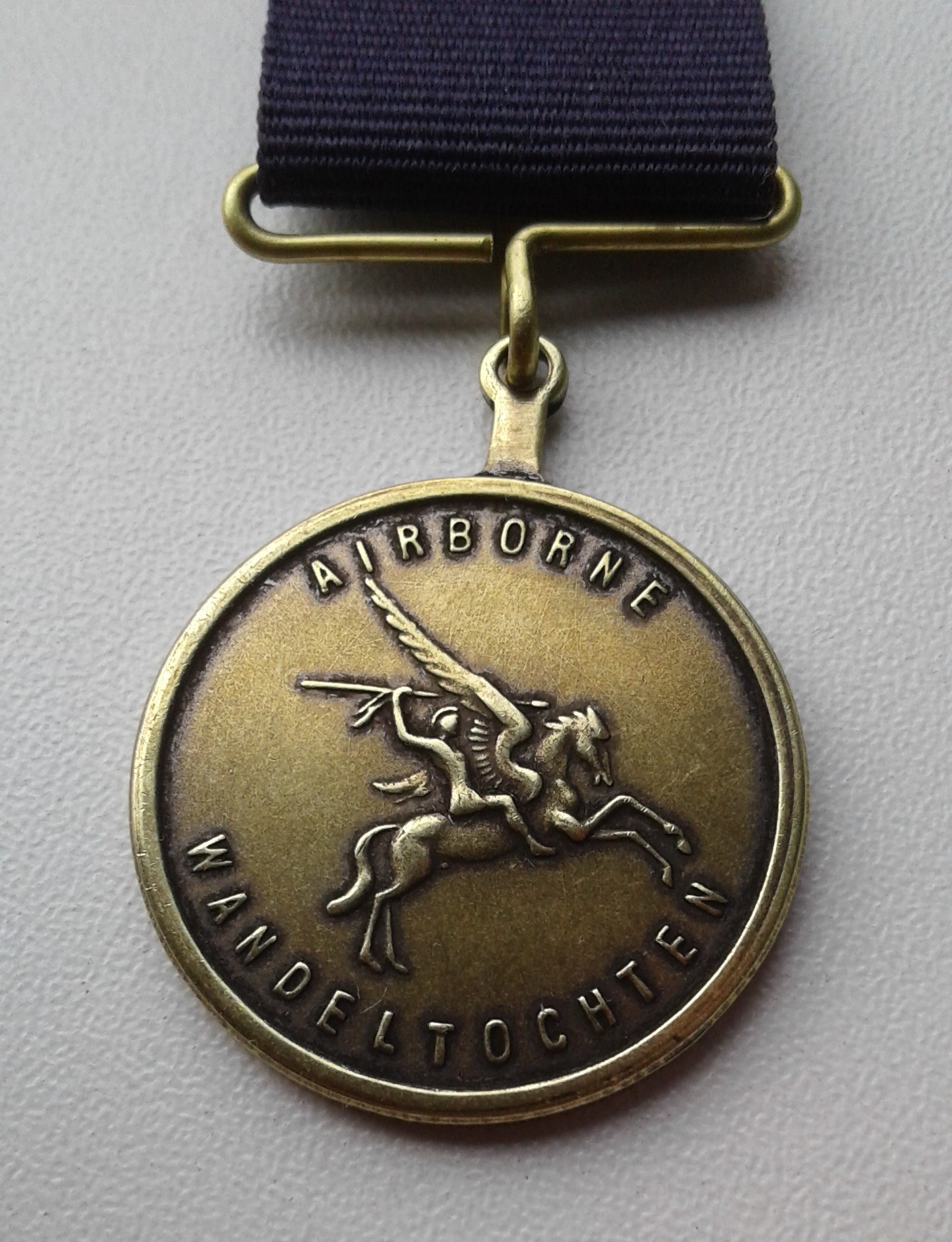
Medal with the Pegasus sign
