= Dorenweerd College =

School in Gelderland, Netherlands

Coordinates: 51.985166°N 5.797396°E

Information
- Former name: Duno College
- Established: 1999; 26 years ago
- Teaching staff: 89 (2013)
- Enrollment: 1144 (2014)
- Language: English; Dutch
- Website: www.dorenweerd.nl

The Dorenweerd College (formerly Duno College) is a school in the Forests of Doorwerth in the Dutch province Gelderland.

Education in Dutch and English is offered on 3 levels. The College was founded in 1999 in a merging of several institutes within the City of Renkum. The College has 89 teachers (2013) and 1144 students (2014). The current Rector is Ms. Gabri Maessen.

== Notable students ==
- Marianne Thieme (born 1972), politician and vegetarian
