= De Kromme Dissel =

Coordinates: 51°59′3.04″N 5°45′30.15″E

- Interactive map of De Kromme Dissel

Restaurant information
- Established: 1968
- Food type: Frans
- Rating: Michelin Guide
- Location: Klein Zwitserlandlaan 5, Heelsum, 6866 DS, Netherlands
- Seating capacity: 50
- Website: Official website

De Kromme Dissel is a restaurant located in Heelsum in the Netherlands. It is a fine dining restaurant that was awarded one Michelin stars in the period 1971 to present. GaultMillau awarded the restaurant 16.0 points. (Out of 20)

Present head chef of De Kromme Dissel is Tonny Berentsen. Bert Willemsen was the first head chef to earn the Michelin star in 1971.

Restaurant De Kromme Dissel is part of the Bilderberg hotel chain.

The restaurant is located in an old Saxon farmhouse.

== List of head chefs ==
1. Bert Willemsen (1971 - ...)
2. Klaas Jan van Kammen
3. Bert Willemsen (... - 1987)
4. Angelique Schmeinck (1988 - 2000)
5. Tonny Berentsen (2000–present)

== See also ==
- List of Michelin starred restaurants in the Netherlands
