= Derk Bolt =

Dutch television presenter, editor and producer

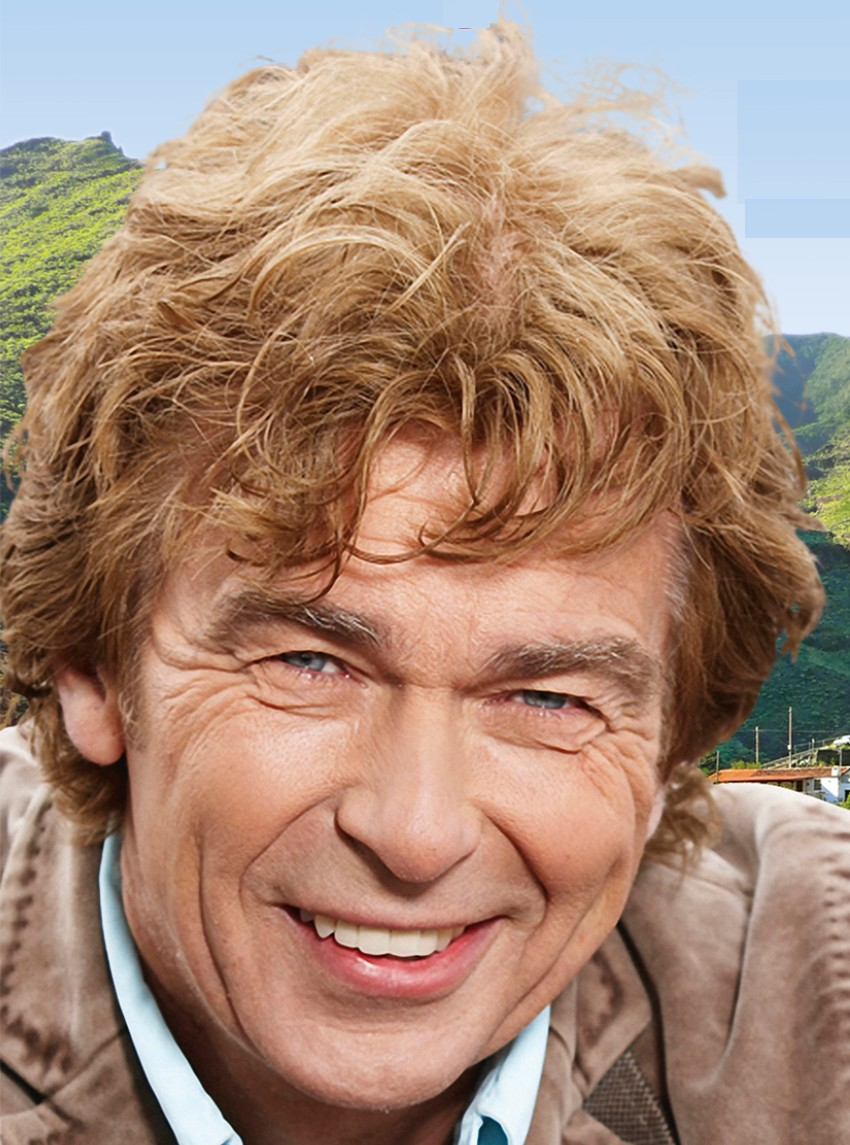
- Born: 24 May 1955 (age 71); Renkum, Netherlands
- Presenting career
- Show: Spoorloos
- Country: Netherlands

Derk Bolt (born 24 May 1955) is a Dutch television presenter, editor and producer.

He was born in Renkum. After studying journalism (a program which he did not finish) in Utrecht, Bolt started his career at the late night actualities daily radio show Met het Oog op Morgen and as editor at the Alles is Anders Show (KRO). After that he was, among others, reporter at the actualities television show Brandpunt (English: "Focus"). He is especially known for his work, first as presenter and later as editor and field reporter for long running Dutch television show Spoorloos (the Dutch equivalent of Find My Family), where Bolt and his colleagues reunite people with long lost relatives. He also (co-)presented other shows including Nederland te koop, Gezellig naar de Krim/Gezellig naar Marokko and Brieven boven water. Bolt was also the producer of a number of shows, such as ooggetuige (English: Eye Witness) and Lieve Martine (English: Dear Martine).

Bolt was raised Dutch Reformed, is not married and has two children.

== Kidnapping and aftermath ==
On 19 June 2017 the Colombian news paper El Tiempo announced that Bolt had been kidnapped together with his colleague Eugenio Follender two days earlier by the left-wing guerrilla organization ELN. It happened in the town of El Tarra in the state of Norte de Santander. While this was first denied by the leaders of ELN, it was later confirmed by sources in the organization. By 23 June, both had been released.

== See also ==
- List of kidnappings
- List of solved missing person cases (post-2000)
