= Doorwerth =

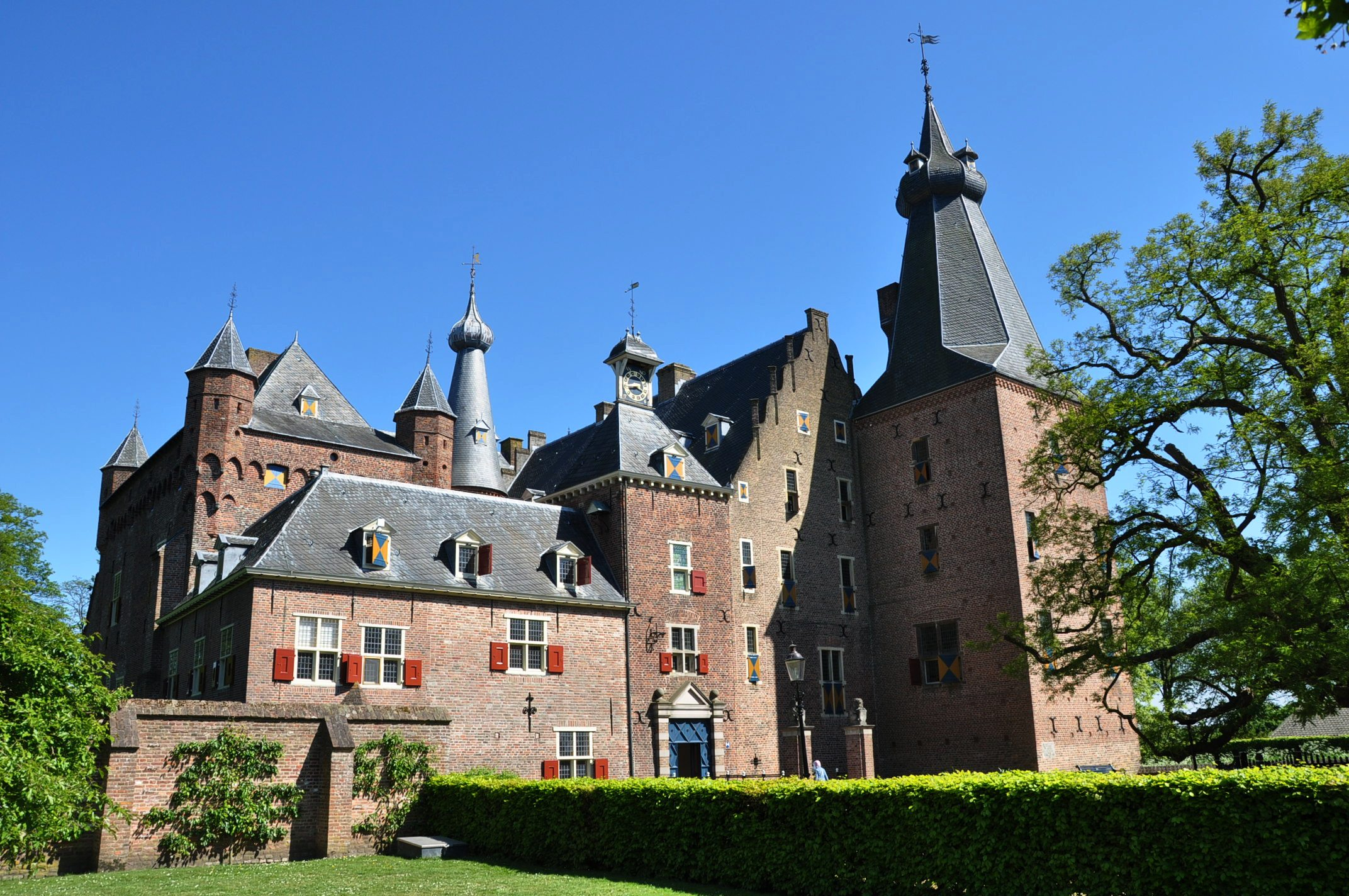
- Castle Doorwerth

- Coat of arms

- Location in the Netherlands Doorwerth (Netherlands)
- Coordinates: 51°58′41″N 5°47′43″E
- Country: Netherlands
- Province: Gelderland
- Municipality: Renkum

Government
  - Body: Renkum Municipal council
  - Mayor: Mrs. A.M.J. (Agnes) Schaap

Population (2017)
  - Total: 4,887
- Website: www.renkum.nl

Doorwerth (Dutch pronunciation: [ˈdoːrʋɛrt]) is a village in the eastern Netherlands. It is located in the municipality of Renkum, Gelderland, about 8 km west of Arnhem and about 100 km southeast of Amsterdam.

== History ==
The valley of the Seelbeek has been in residential use since prehistoric times. The recorded history of Doorwerth started in the early Middle Ages when a small castle was built in the Seelbeek valley and later the current Doorwerth Castle was founded. The old village grew around the castle near the banks of the river Rhine. Most of the houses of the old village near the castle were damaged during World War II, all of them where abandoned and demolished after the war. The current cores of the village were developed from 1923 onwards, when the Van der Molenallee was constructed.

Doorwerth was a separate municipality between 1818 and 1923. The grounds of this municipality extended from Heelsum, till Oosterbeek until what is now known as Wolfheze. In 1923 it became a part of the Renkum municipality.

Doorwerth Castle is located south of the village, on the Rhine.

Since 1999 the Dorenweerd College (former "Duno college") located in the vicinity of Doorwerth. It is an amalgamation of five schools in the municipality Renkum.

== Notable people from Doorwerth ==
- Stephan Brenninkmeijer (born 1964), film director and editor
- Marianne Thieme (born 1972), politician and vegetarian
- Afrodite Zegers (born 1991), Olympic athlete

== Gallery ==
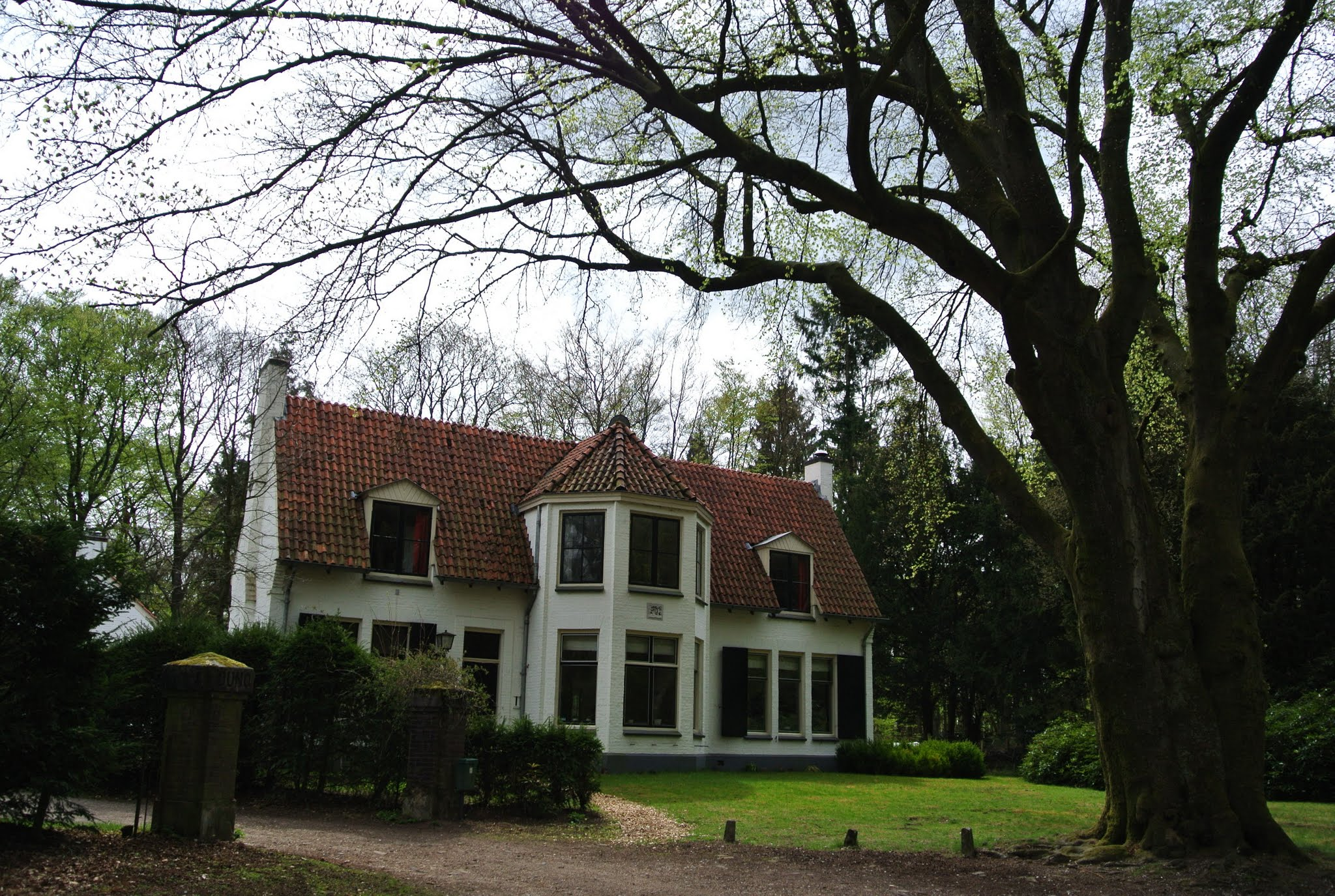
Villa in Doorwerth

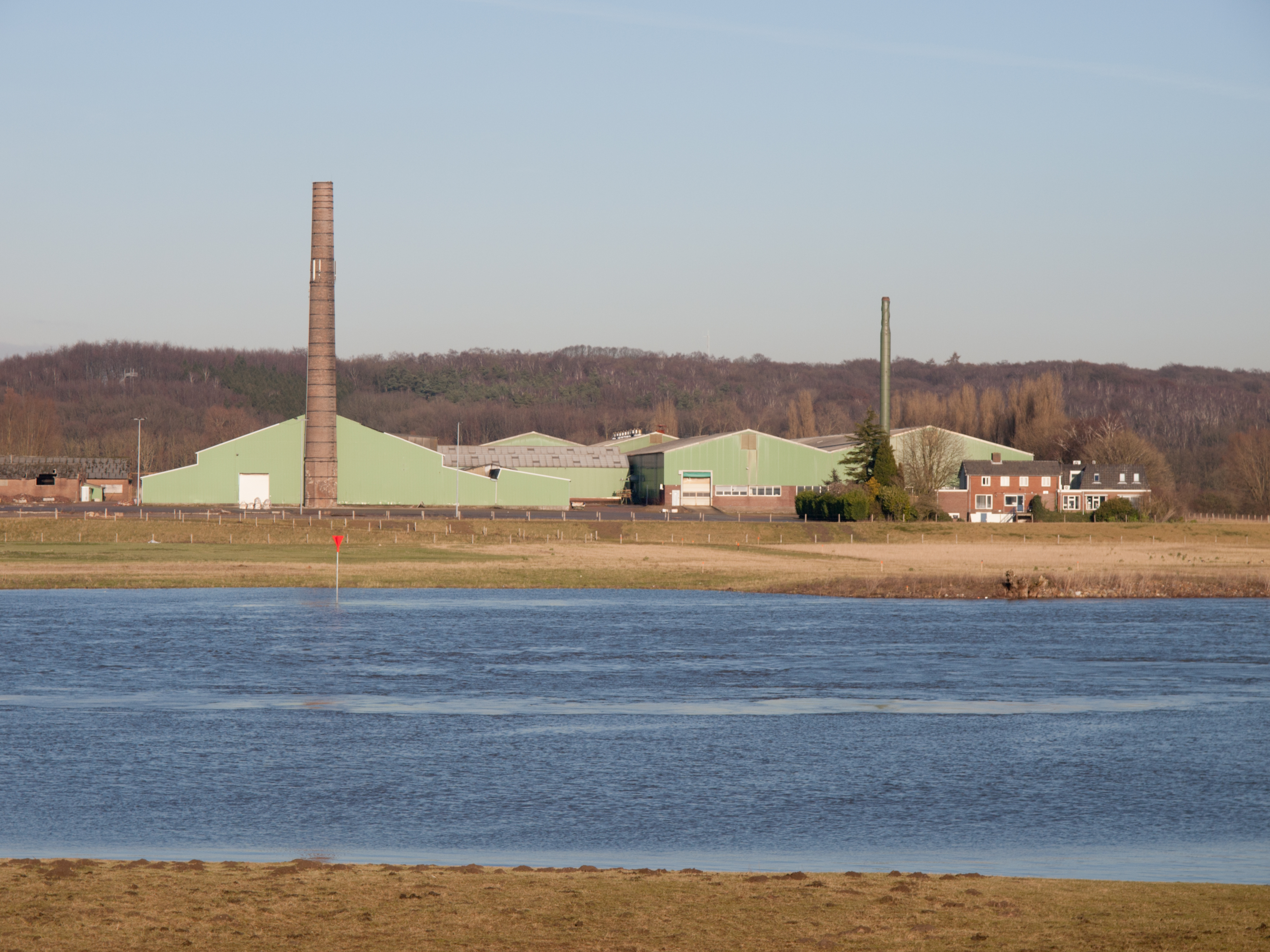
Brickworks

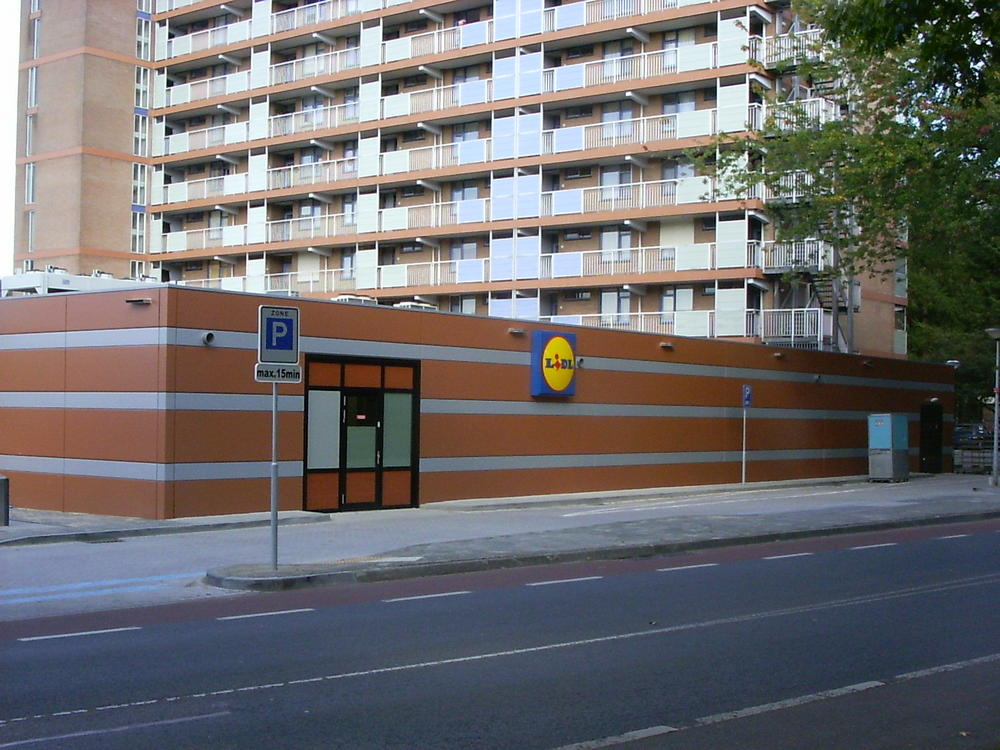
Apartment block with supermarket

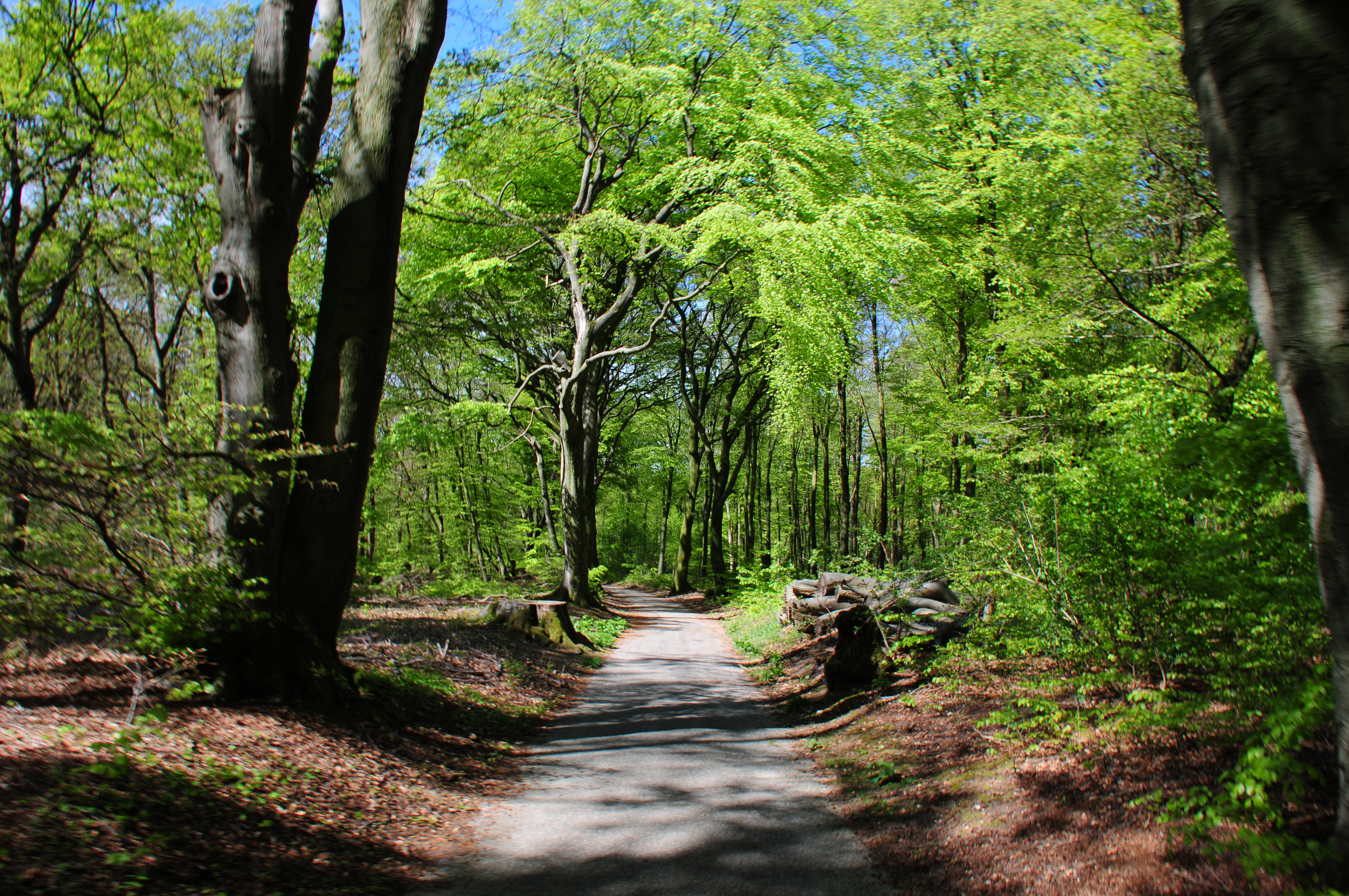
Path through the forest
