= Oosterbeek =

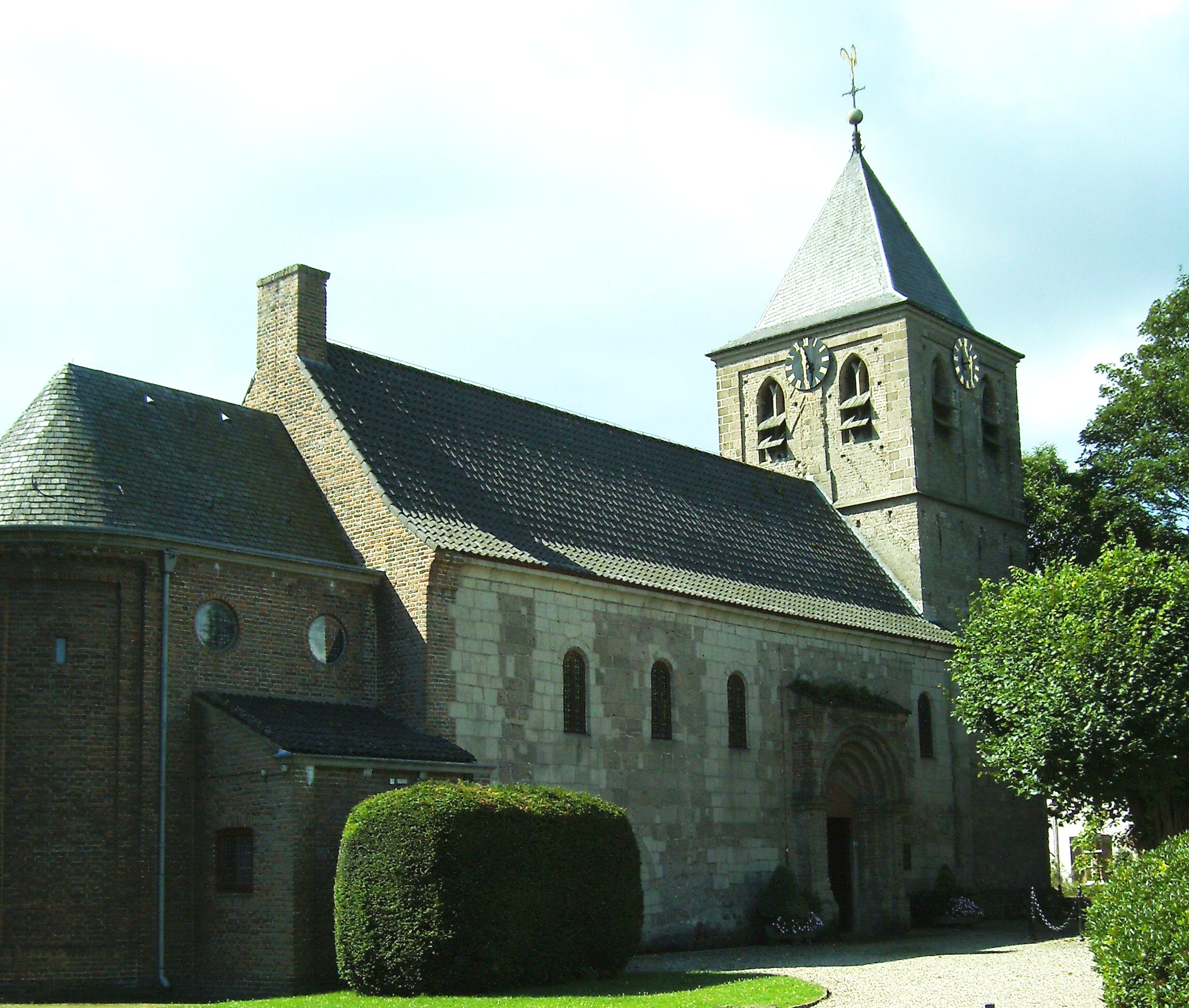
- The Reformed Church (Oude Kerk (Oosterbeek))
- Interactive map of Oosterbeek
- Coordinates: 51°59′5″N 5°50′40″E
- Country: Netherlands
- Province: Gelderland
- Municipality: Renkum

Government
  - Body: Renkum Municipal council
  - Mayor: Mrs. A.M.J. (Agnes) Schaap

Population (2021)
  - Total: 11,374
- Website: www.renkum.nl

Oosterbeek (Dutch pronunciation: [ˈoːstərbeːk]) is a village in the eastern part of Netherlands. It is located in the municipality of Renkum in the province of Gelderland, about 5 km (3.1 mi) west of Arnhem.

The oldest part of Oosterbeek is the Benedendorp (Lower Village), on the northern bank of the Lower Rhine. One landmark in the village is the Hervormde Kerk (Reformed Church), which has certain architectural sections that date back to the second half of the 10th century. It is the oldest church in the country which is still in use.

Oosterbeek was a separate municipality until 1818, when the area was divided between Doorwerth and the village of Renkum. In the 19th century, several mansions were built on the higher ground to the north of the old village. One of these mansions, called De Hemelse Berg, was destroyed in 1944. Another, called Hartenstein, is now home to the Airborne Museum. The construction of smaller buildings in the same area led to the creation of the Bovendorp (Upper Village). To the north of the built-up area lies the Arnhem Oosterbeek War Cemetery.

The village is known for its involvement in the September 1944 Battle of Arnhem, during which it was heavily damaged. General Roy Urquhart of Britain had his headquarters at Hotel Hartenstein. In May 1978 Urquhart opened the Airborne Museum in the hotel, which commemorates the Battle of Arnhem.

Oosterbeek is also the location of the Hotel de Bilderberg, where the Bilderberg Group first met in 1954.

== Oosterbeek School ==
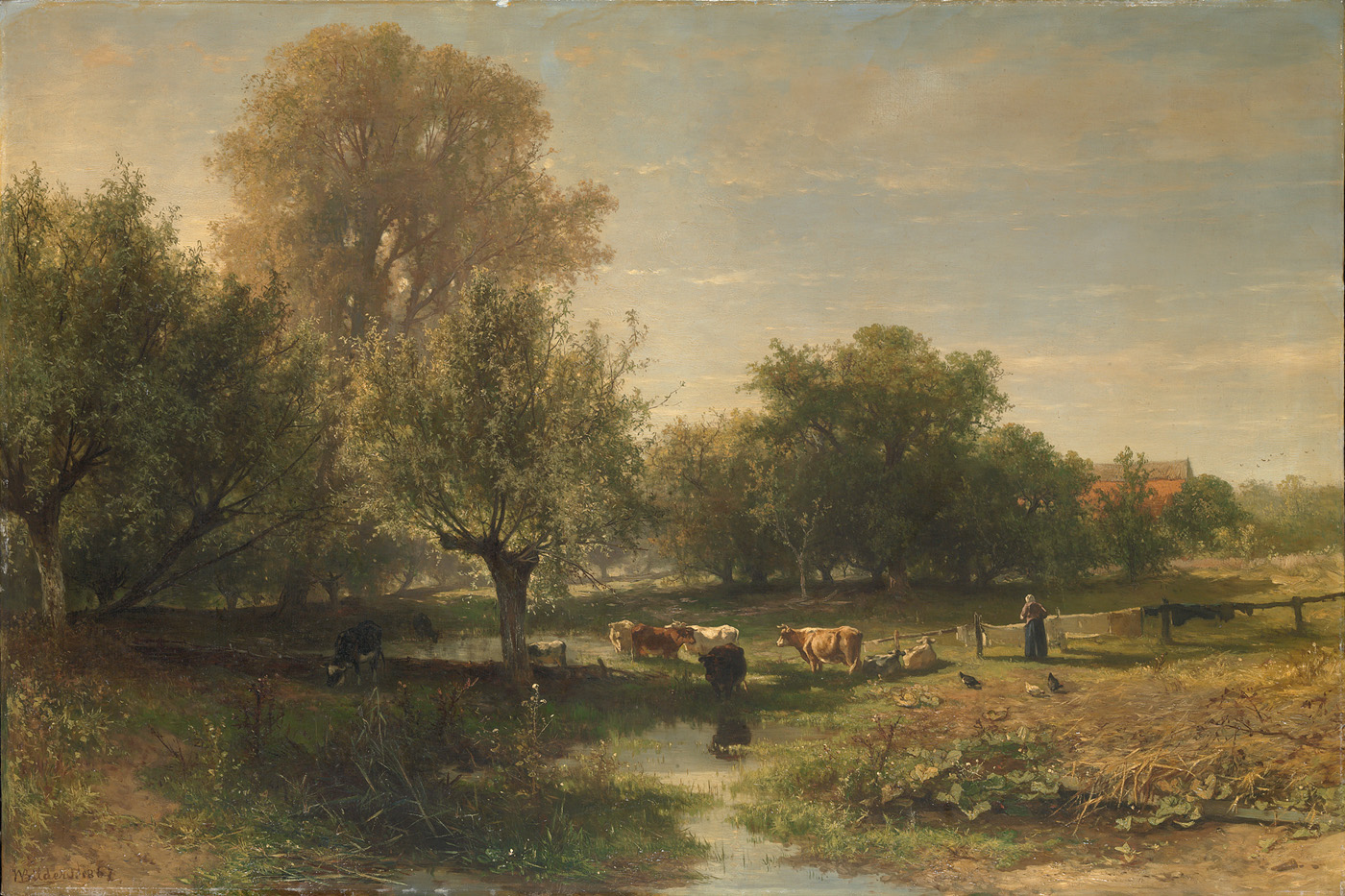
Willem Roelofs (1867): Landscape with cattle in Oosterbeek (Gelderland province), Amsterdam Museum.

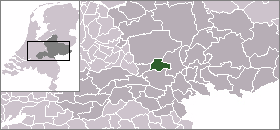
The location of the Renkum municipality in the Netherlands.

The Oosterbeek School is known as the birthplace of Dutch Impressionism, along with the nearby village of Wolfheze. Art historians call this the Barbizon of the North. The school's most successful period was from 1841 until 1870, before the artists turned to Laren, Kortenhoef, Egmond aan Zee, Katwijk aan Zee, Scheveningen, and Noordwijk, where they founded new art colonies or painters' villages. During this time, they established the Pulchri Studio in The Hague and opened the second Golden Age of Dutch painting. Consequently, they became the forerunners of the Modern art movement in the Netherlands.

Artists who were part of the movement near Oosterbeek include Gerard Bilders, Paul Gabriël, Barend Cornelis Koekkoek, Jacob Maris, Matthijs Maris, Willem Maris, Anton Mauve, Hendrik Mesdag, Willem Roelofs, and Jan Hendrik Weissenbruch.

== Transport ==
Oosterbeek has a railway station that opened on 16 May 1845. It is on the Amsterdam–Arnhem railway (Rhijnspoorweg). The primary bus line, 352, connects Oosterbeek with Wageningen and Arnhem.

== Airborne March ==
The commemorative Airborne March is held in Oosterbeek every year on the first Saturday of September. The event started in 1947 and involves thousands of people, who walk 10 kilometers, 15 kilometers, or 25 kilometers. A 40-kilometer distance was added in the early 21st century.

== Well-known people ==
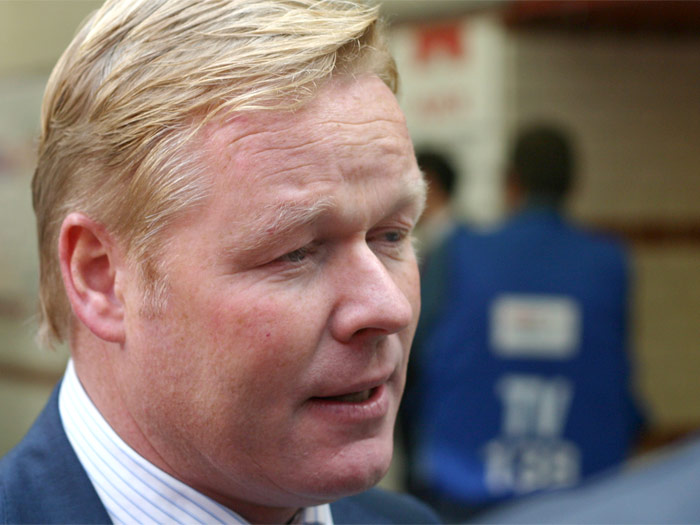
Football trainer Ronald Koeman used to live in Oosterbeek. Photo by Paul Blank.

- Eric Corton (1969), singer, actor, and presenter
- Esmée Denters (1988), singer
- Albertino Essers (1969), darts player
- Ronald Koeman (1963), ex-football player and coach
- Kate ter Horst (1906), hero of the Battle of Arnhem, cared for British paratroopers injured in the battle

== Photos ==
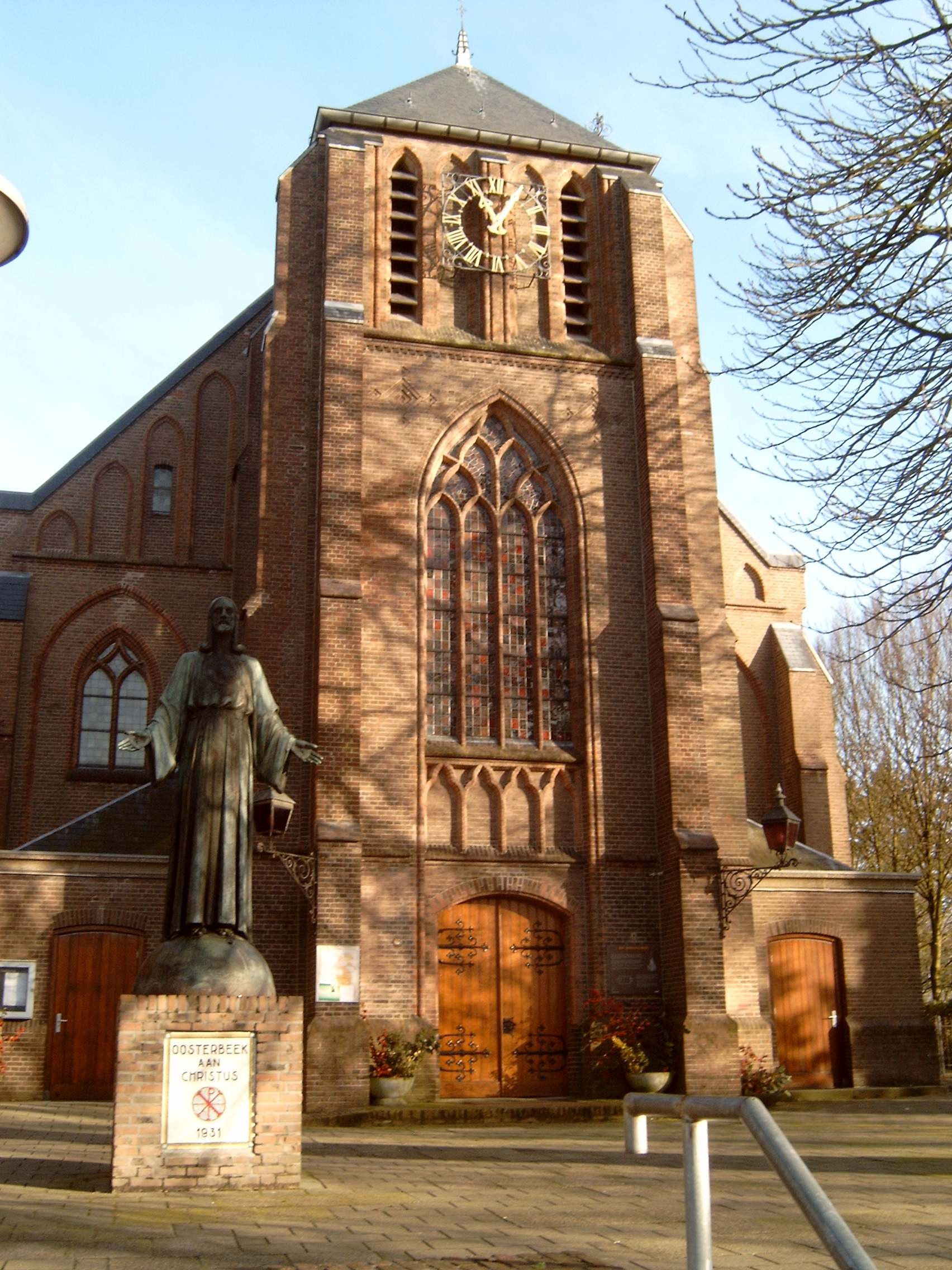
The Roman Catholic St. Bernulphus Church (1884)

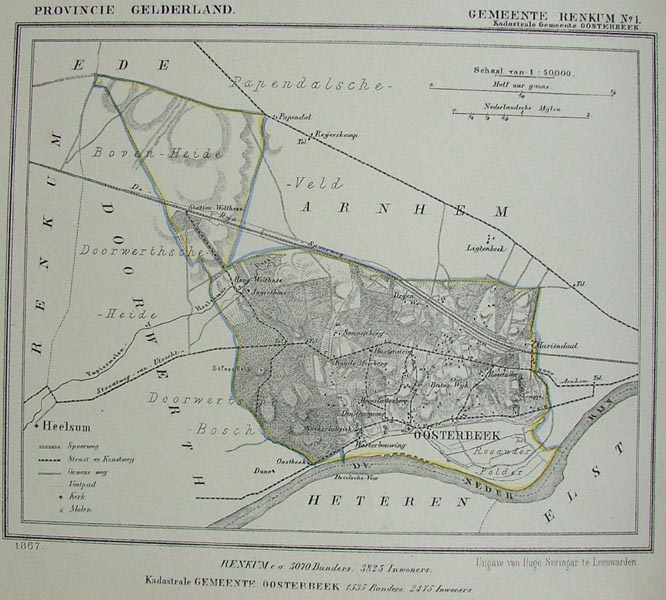
A map of Oosterbeek (1867)

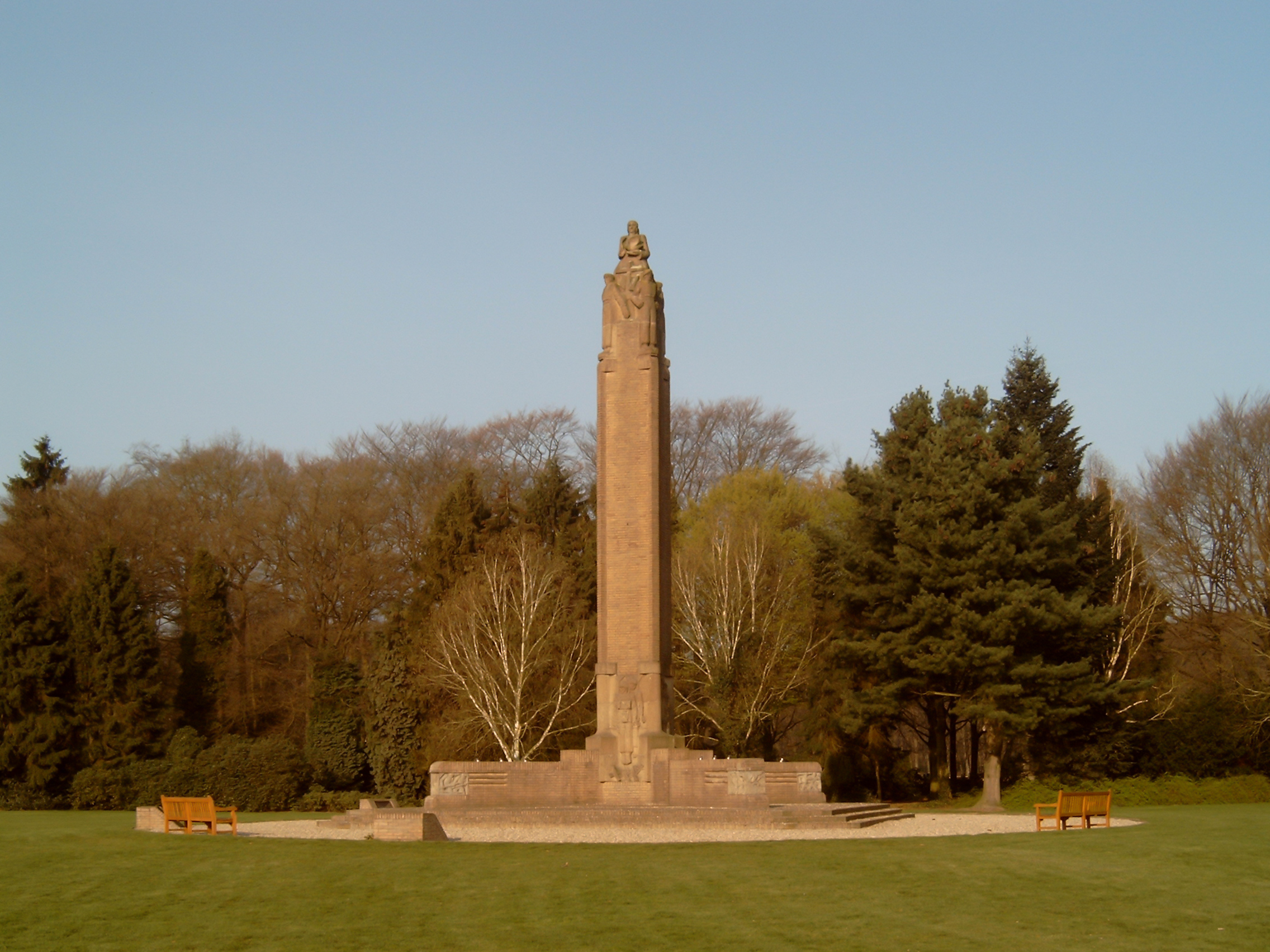
War Monument

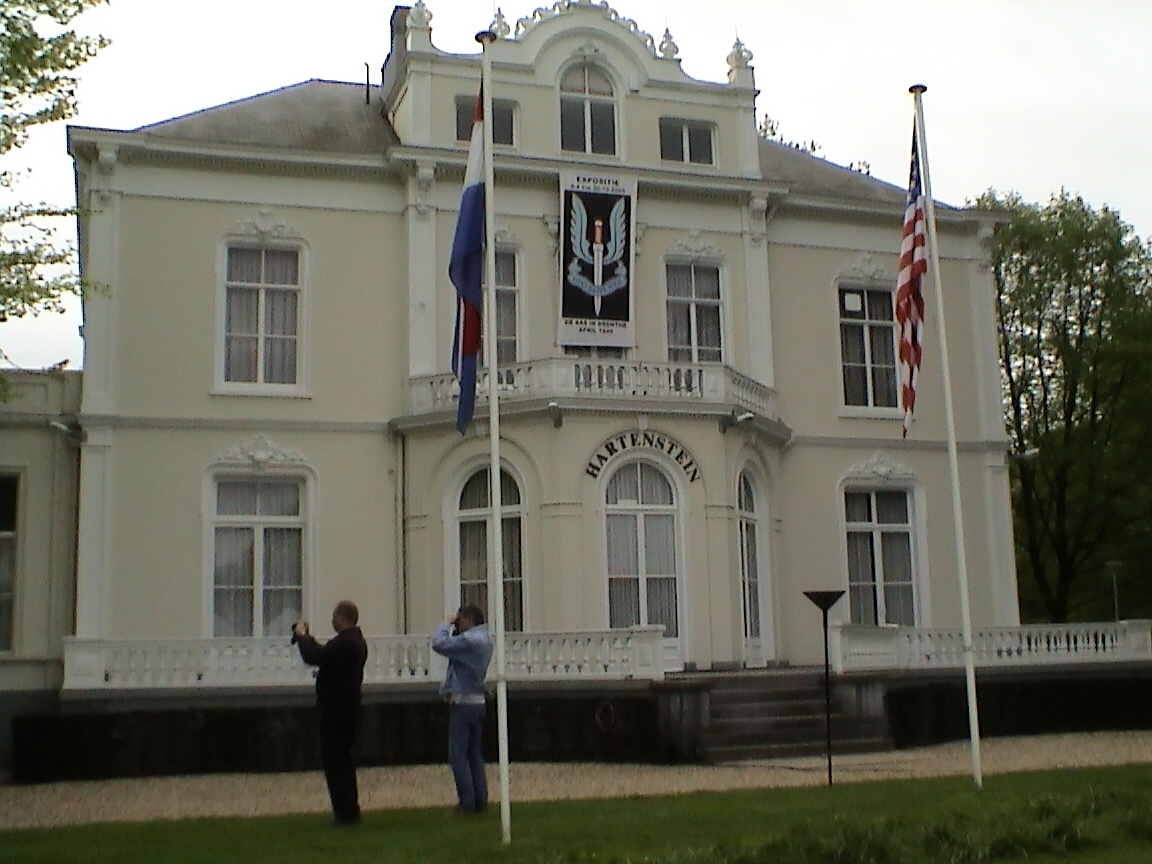
The Hartenstein Airborne Museum
