= Renkum (village) =

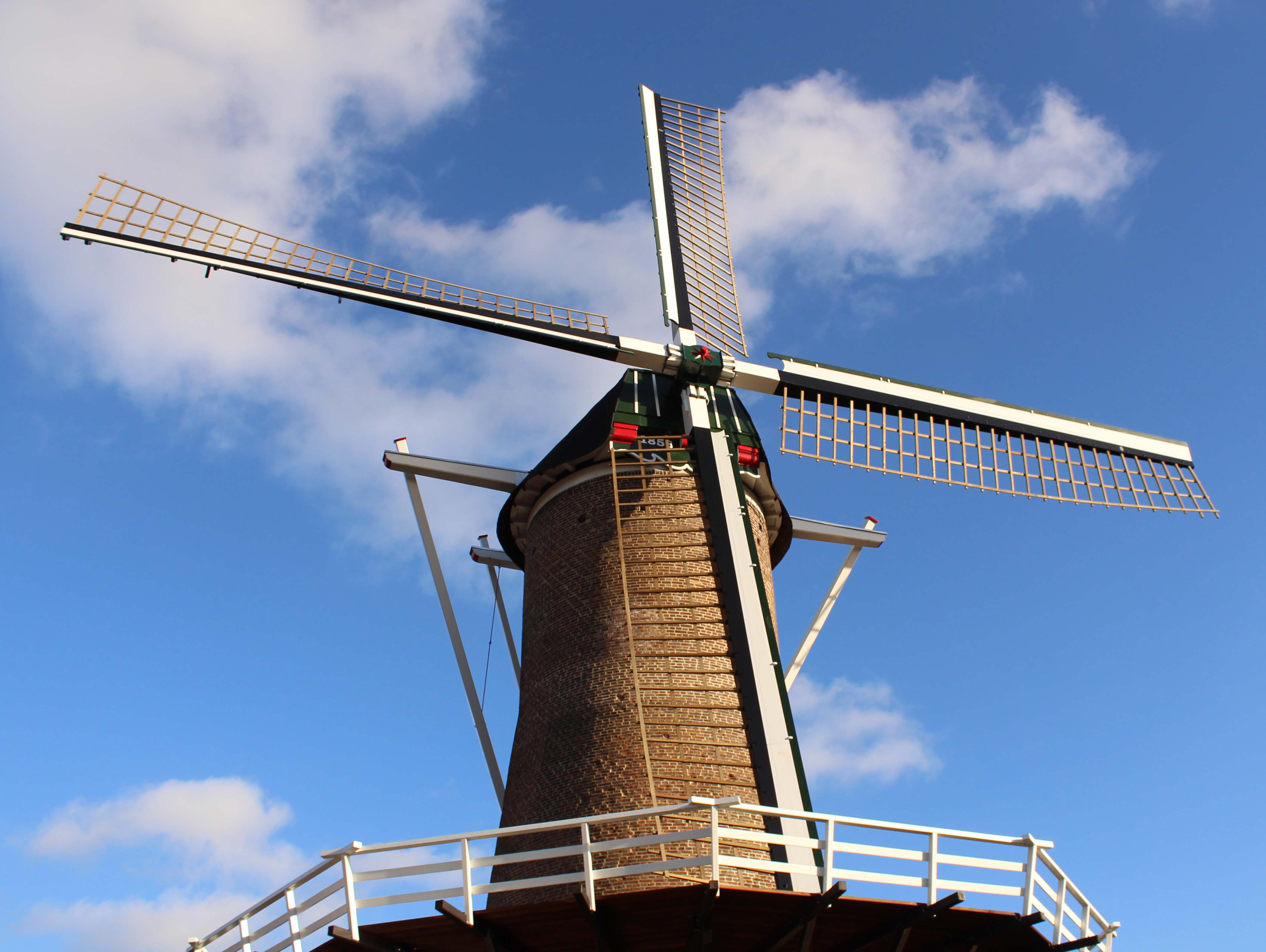
- Coordinates: 51°58′56″N 5°44′5″E
- Country: Netherlands
- Province: Gelderland
- Municipality: Renkum

Population (01-05-2015)
  - Total: 9,245
- Area code: 0317

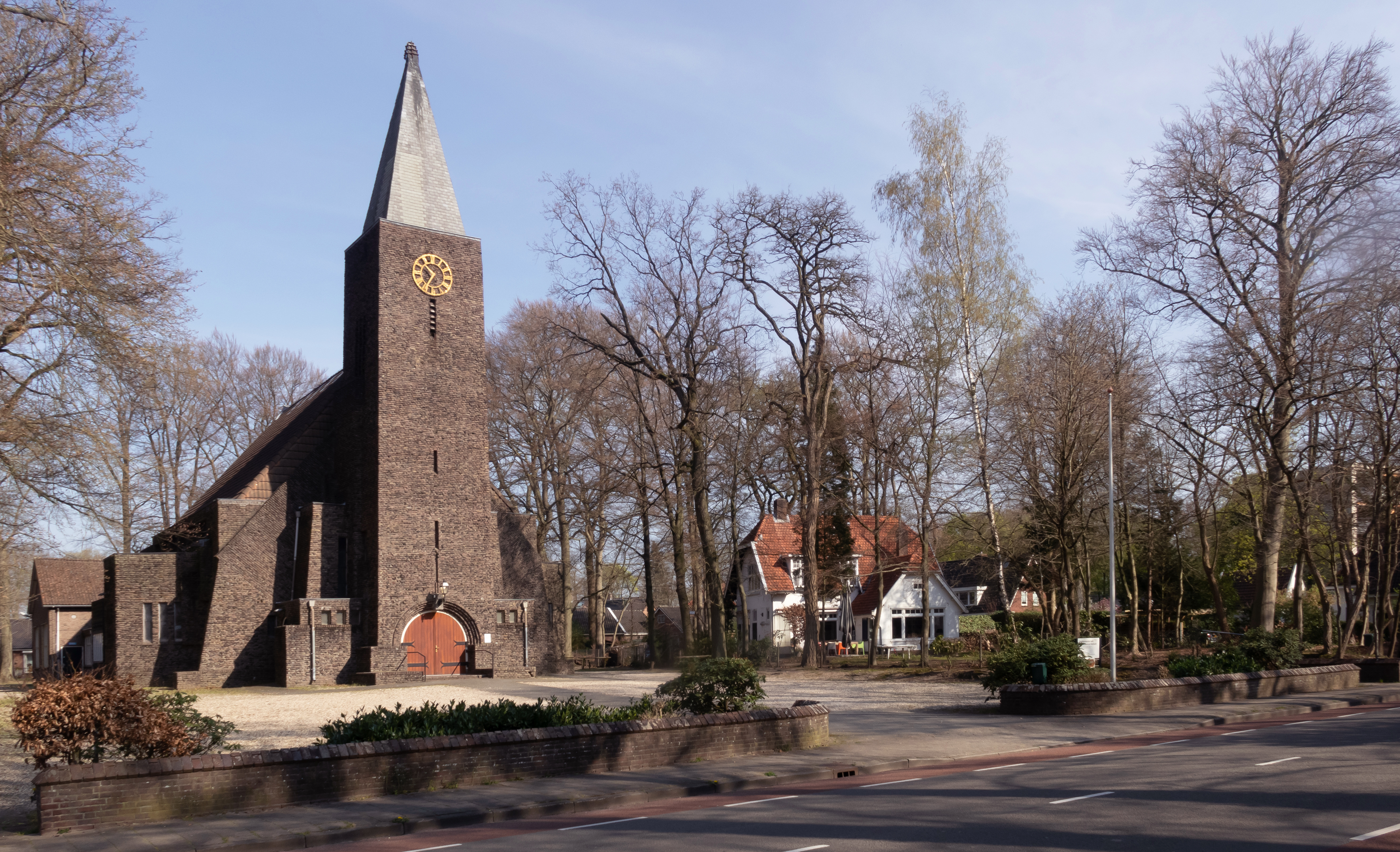
Reformed church in Renkum

Renkum is a village in the municipality of Renkum.

In the early days, the name of the village was written as Redinchem. In the 19th century, Renkum developed itself. There existed six paper mills, three water-cornmills and one water-oil mill. There were two factories, a treacle factory and a potato starch-flour factory.

During World War II, Renkum was involved in the Battle of Arnhem.

== Notable people from Renkum ==
- Derk Bolt (born 1955 in Renkum) a Dutch TV presenter, editor and producer
- Kay van Dijk (born 1984 in Renkum) a Dutch volleyball player, competed in the 2004 Summer Olympics
- Nol Hendriks (1937, born in Renkum), businessman and football executive
- Bjorn Stenvers (1972, grew up in Renkum), international museum director
- Xan de Waard (1995, born in Renkum), field hockey player
- Piet de Zwarte (1948, born in Renkum), water polo player
