= Nol Hendriks =

Dutch businessman and football executive

Arnold "Nol" Hendriks
- Born: Arnold Hendriks; May 15, 1937; Renkum, Netherlands
- Died: October 21, 2017 (aged 80); Netherlands
- Occupation(s): Businessman, football executive
- Known for: Financial backer and technical director of Roda JC; role in Parkstad Limburg Stadion project
- Spouse: Margaretha Hendriks (died 2000s)
- Children: Ronald Hendriks; Myrjam Hendriks

Arnold (Nol) Hendriks (15 May 1937 – 21 October 2017) was a Dutch businessman and football executive.

== Business career ==
Born in Renkum, he moved to Limburg with his parents when his father started working in the mines in Heerlen. He later worked in the mines himself and as a grocer and dry-cleaner, before becoming a self-made millionaire in the textile business.

=== Roda JC ===
Hendriks got involved in the Roda JC football club in the early 1980s. He started backing the club financially and became a technical director as well as a member of Roda's supervisory board. He even scouted players himself and his financial injections made Roda JC one of the leading clubs in Holland behind the country's traditional big three, culminating in finishing second to then Champions League holders Ajax in the 1994–95 Eredivisie season and winning the KNVB Cup twice.

Hendriks was also one of the driving forces behind the club's new Parkstad Limburg Stadion, which was opened in 2000. In his later years he severed ties with the club, but was still used as an advisor and made honorary member of the club.

== Personal life ==
Hendriks' wife Margaretha died in the 2000s. He backed out of his businesses when handing them over to his children Ronald and Myrjam in September 2017.

=== Death ===
Hendriks was rushed to hospital with a brain hemorrhage in October 2017 and died on the 21st of that month.
