= Piet de Zwarte =

Dutch water polo player (born 1948)

Personal information
- Born: February 16, 1948 (age 78) Renkum, Netherlands

Sport
- Sport: Water polo
Medal record
Representing Netherlands
Olympic Games
Bronze medal – third place	1976 Montreal	Team competition

Pieter ("Piet") Karel de Zwarte (born 16 February 1948) is a former Dutch water polo player, who won the bronze medal with the Dutch Men's Team at the 1976 Summer Olympics in Montreal, Quebec, Canada.

== See also ==
- List of Olympic medalists in water polo (men)
