= Kay van Dijk =

Dutch volleyball player (born 1984)

Personal information
- Full name: Kay van Dijk
- Nationality: Dutch
- Born: June 25, 1984 (age 42); Renkum, Netherlands
- Height: 2.16 m (7 ft 1 in)
- Weight: 108 kg (238 lb)
- Spike: 365 cm (144 in)
- Block: 355 cm (140 in)

Volleyball information
- Position: Opposite
- Current club: Tianjin

Career
Years	Teams
2003–2004; 2004–2005; 2005–2008; 2008–2009; 2009–2010; 2010–2011; 2011–2012; 2012–2013; 2013–2014; 2014–2014; 2014–2015; 2015–2016; 2016–2017; 2017–2018; 2018; 2018–2019; 2019; 2020–2021; 2021-2022	Landstede Volleybal; Omniworld Almere; Noliko Maaseik; Gumi LIG Insurance; Pallavolo Loreto; ACH Volley Ljubljana; Argos Sora; Pallavolo Molfetta; Jaroslawich Yaroslavl; Trentino Volley; ZAKSA Kędzierzyn-Koźle; Al Ain; Ziraat Bankasi Ankara; Paykan Tehran VC; Emma Villas Volley; Libertad Burgi; PAOK; Tianjin Volley; Lvi Praha

National team
2003–2013	Netherlands
Honours
Representing Netherlands
Men's volleyball
European League
Silver medal – second place	2008 Turkey
- Last updated: 19 February 2017

Kay van Dijk (born 25 June 1984) is a Dutch professional volleyball player, a member of Netherlands men's national volleyball team in 2003-2013 and Persian club Peykan Tehran volleyball club, a participant of the Olympic Games Athens 2004, a silver medalist of the European League 2008, Belgium Champion (2008), Slovenian Champion (2011).

== Career ==
Dijk famous team member in 2014 he was a player of Trentino Volley, but during the season 2014/2015 he moved to the Polish club ZAKSA Kędzierzyn-Koźle and signed one-year contract. He replaced in the team Grzegorz Bociek - opposite hitter, who informed about interruption of sporting career because of serious disease. In April 2015 he left Polish club.

== Sporting achievements ==
=== CEV Cup ===
- 2007/2008 - with Noliko Maaseik

=== National championship ===
- 2005/2006 Belgium Championship, with Noliko Maaseik
- 2006/2007 Belgium Cup, with Noliko Maaseik
- 2006/2007 Belgium Championship, with Noliko Maaseik
- 2007/2008 Belgium Cup, with Noliko Maaseik
- 2007/2008 Belgium Championship, with Noliko Maaseik
- 2010/2011 Slovenian Cup, with ACH Volley Ljubljana
- 2010/2011 Slovenian Championship, with ACH Volley Ljubljana

=== National team ===
- 2008 European League
