= Renkum =

- Municipality
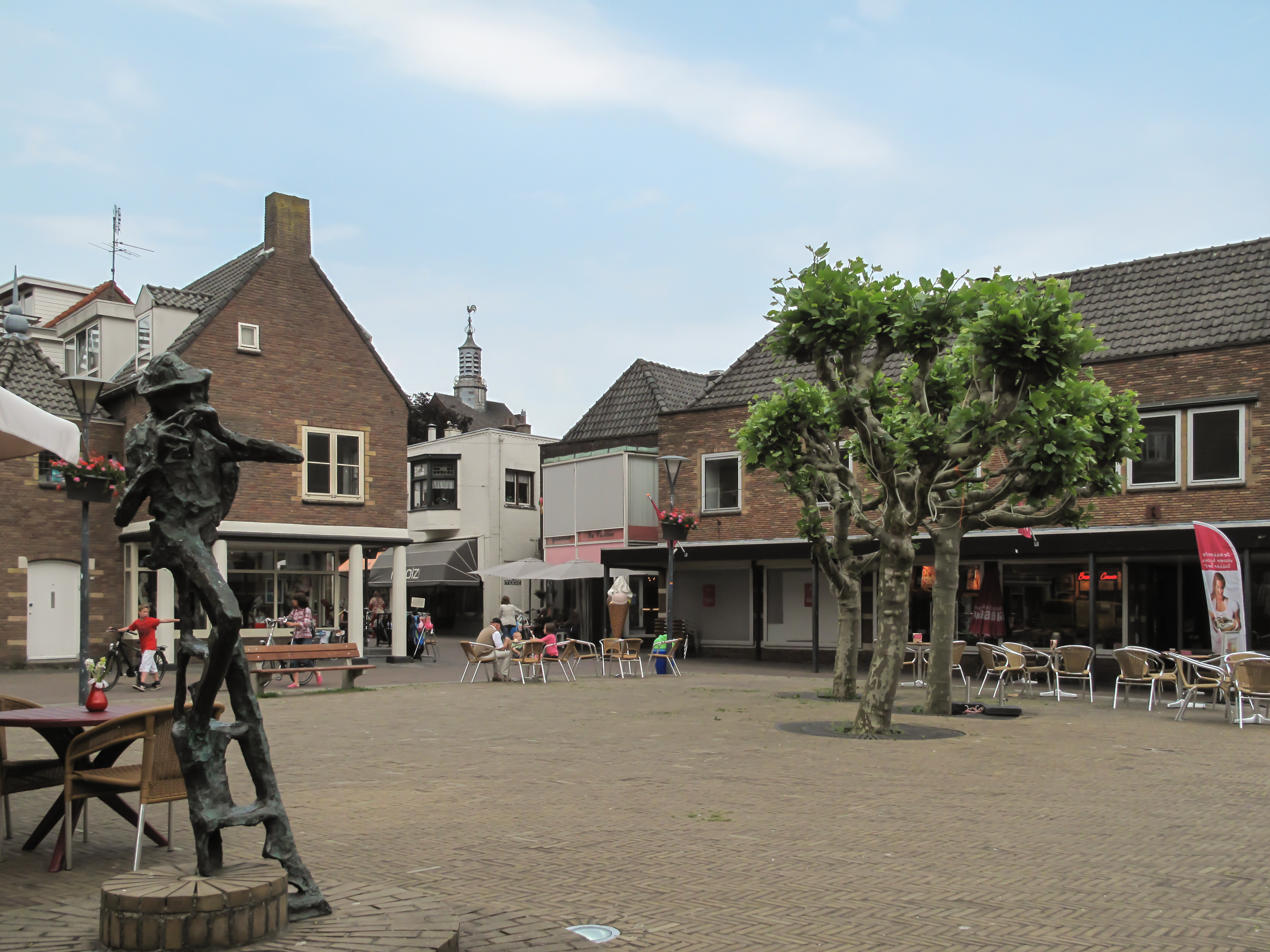
- Renkum town streetview with church tower in the background

- Flag Coat of arms

- Location in Gelderland
- Coordinates: 51°59′N 5°51′E
- Country: Netherlands
- Province: Gelderland

Government
  - Body: Municipal council
  - Mayor: Mrs. A.M.J. (Agnes) Schaap

Area
  - Total: 47.23 km^{2} (18.24 sq mi)
  - Land: 45.95 km^{2} (17.74 sq mi)
  - Water: 1.28 km^{2} (0.49 sq mi)
- Elevation: 51 m (167 ft)

Population (January 2021)
  - Total: 31,417
  - Density: 684/km^{2} (1,770/sq mi)
- Demonym: Renkumer
- Time zone: UTC+1 (CET)
  - Summer (DST): UTC+2 (CEST)
- Postcode: 6860–6874
- Area code: 026, 0317
- Website: www.renkum.nl

Renkum (Dutch pronunciation: [ˈrɛŋkəm]) is a municipality and town in the eastern Netherlands. The municipality had a population of 31,417 in 2021 and has a land area of 45.95 km^{2} (17.74 sq mi). Renkum is situated along the river Rhine. The municipality of Renkum is part of the Stadsregio (English: City region) of Arnhem-Nijmegen.

The surroundings of the municipality are mainly forest and river forelands. In the forest are located tumuli dating back a thousand years. Items found in them can be viewed in the Historical Museum in Arnhem.

== History ==
Renkum is over a thousand years old. Its thousand-year anniversary was celebrated in 1970. In the early days, the name was written as Redinchem. In the 19th century Renkum underwent development, with six paper mills, three water-cornmills and one water-oil mill in operation. There were two factories, producing treacle and potato-starch flour. There was also a brewery and a tavern, de Bok.

Nowadays the town is home to the paper industry, the plant being operated by Parenco B.V., which was acquired by H2 Equity Partners in 2012.

== Population centres ==
- Doorwerth
- Heelsum
- Heveadorp
- Oosterbeek
- Renkum (village)
- Wolfheze

=== Topography ===
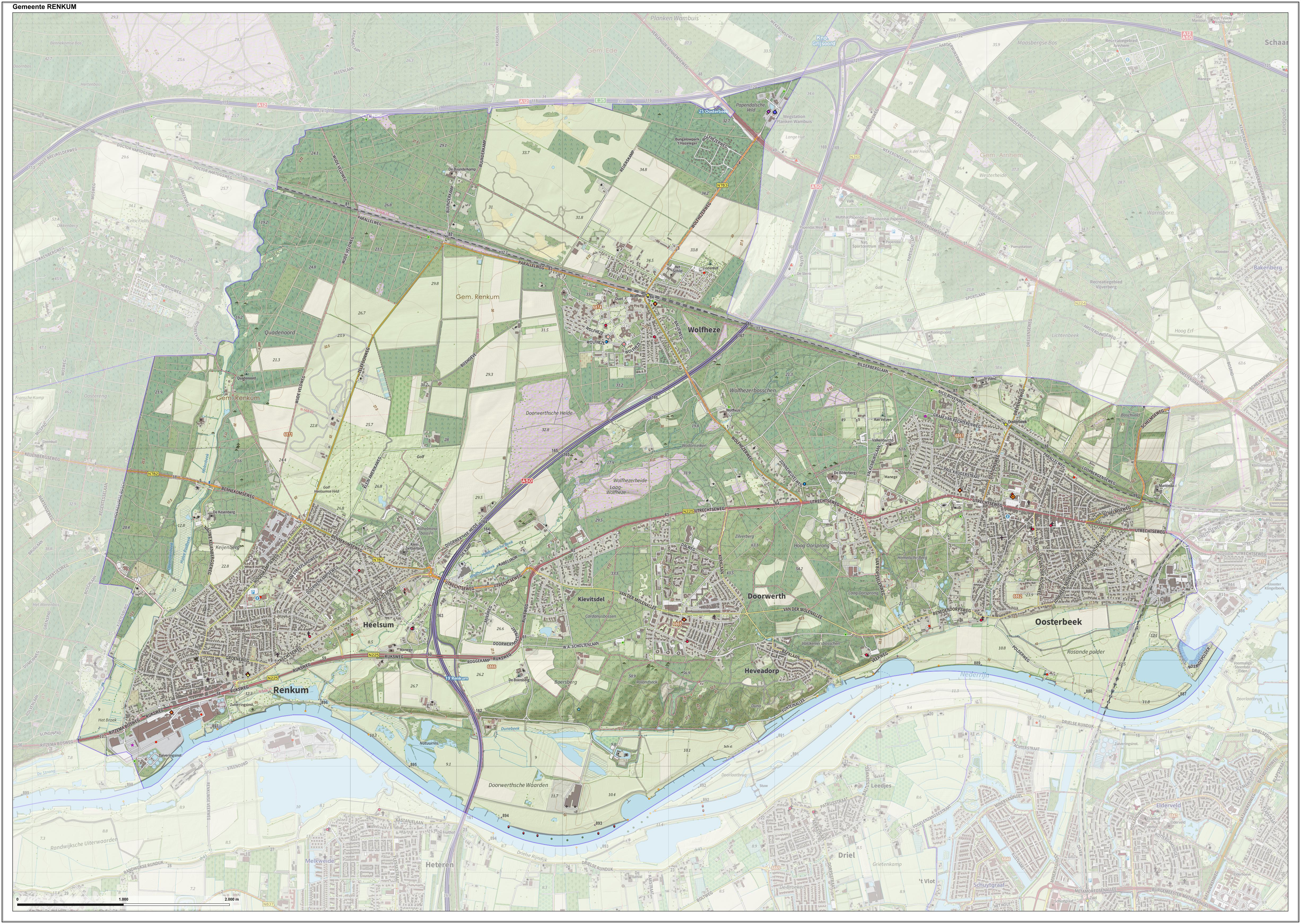

Dutch Topographic map of the municipality of Renkum, June 2015.

== Notable people from Renkum ==
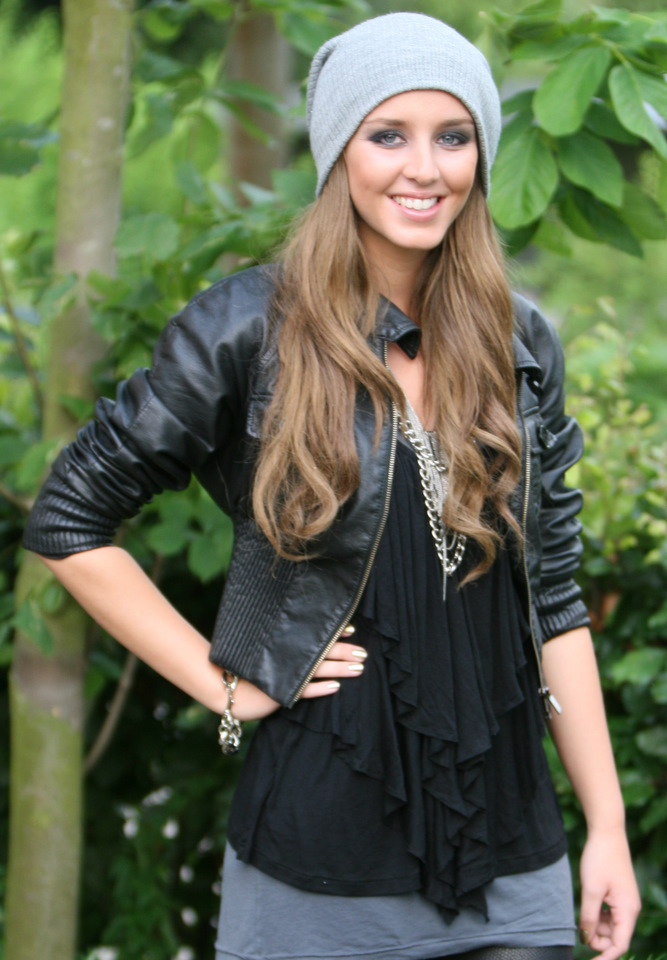
Esme Denters, 2009

- Nol Hendriks (born 1937 in Renkum - 2017), businessman and football executive
- Frank Versteegh (born 1954 in Oosterbeek), aerobatics pilot
- Derk Bolt (born 1955 in Renkum), TV presenter, editor and producer
- Lans Bovenberg (born 1958 in Oosterbeek), economist and academic
- Stephan Brenninkmeijer (born 1964 in Doorwerth), film director, screenwriter, and producer
- Eric Corton (born 1969 in Oosterbeek), presenter, actor, author and DJ
- Constant Kusters (born 1970 in Oosterbeek), politician
- Bjorn Stenvers (born 1972), international museum director, grew up in Renkum
- Marianne Thieme (born 1972), politician, author and animal rights activist; grew up in Renkum
- Esmée Denters (born 1988), singer and YouTube celebrity; grew up in Oosterbeek

=== Sport ===
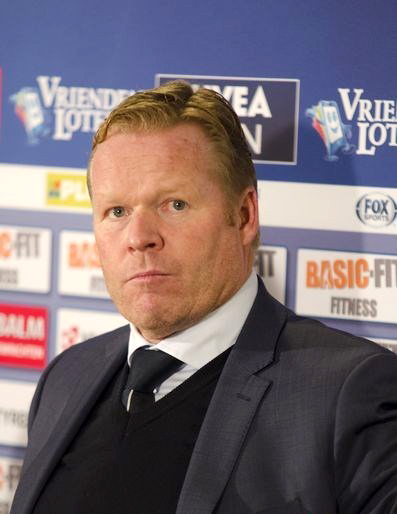
Ronald Koeman, 2014

- Piet de Zwarte (born 1948 in Renkum), water polo player, bronze medallist at the 1976 Summer Olympics
- Marion Bultman (born 1960, in Oosterbeek), sailor, competed at the 1988 Summer Olympics
- Ronald Koeman (born 1963), ex-footballer with 535 club caps, current coach of the Netherlands national football team, lived in Renkum
- Peter Hofstede (born 1967 in Oosterbeek), retired football striker with 370 club caps
- Albertino Essers (born 1969 in Oosterbeek), former professional darts player
- Rein Baart (born 1972 in Oosterbeek), former footballer with 254 club caps
- Kay van Dijk (born 1984 in Renkum), volleyball player, competed in the 2004 Summer Olympics
- Xan de Waard (born 1995 in Renkum), field hockey player, silver medallist at the 2016 Summer Olympics

== Image gallery ==
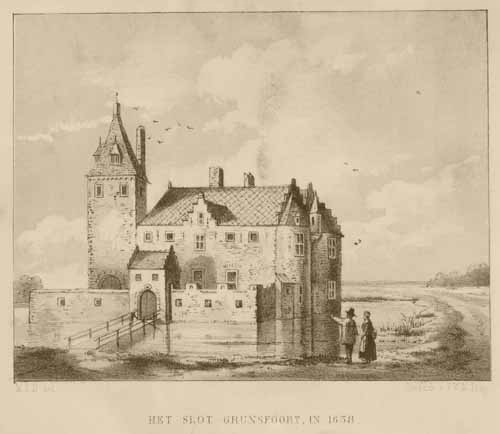
Castle Grunsfort (1638)

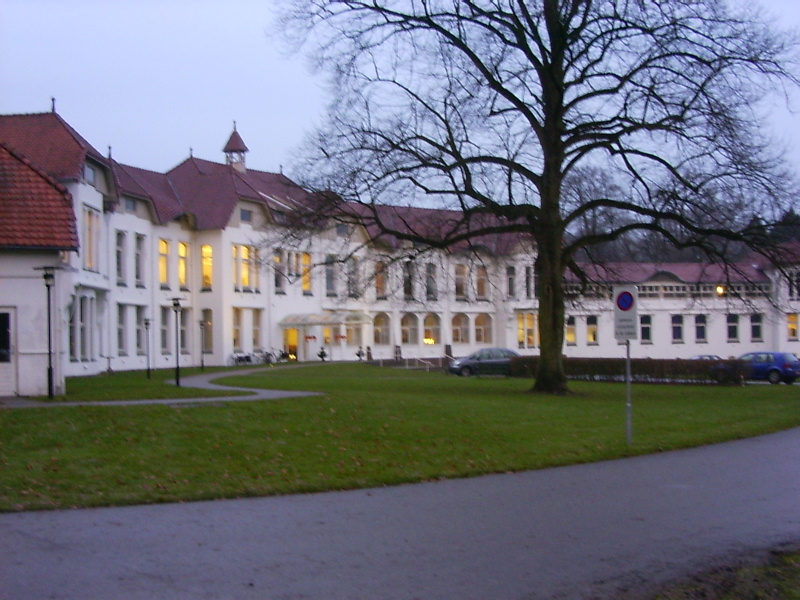
Orange Nassau's Oord

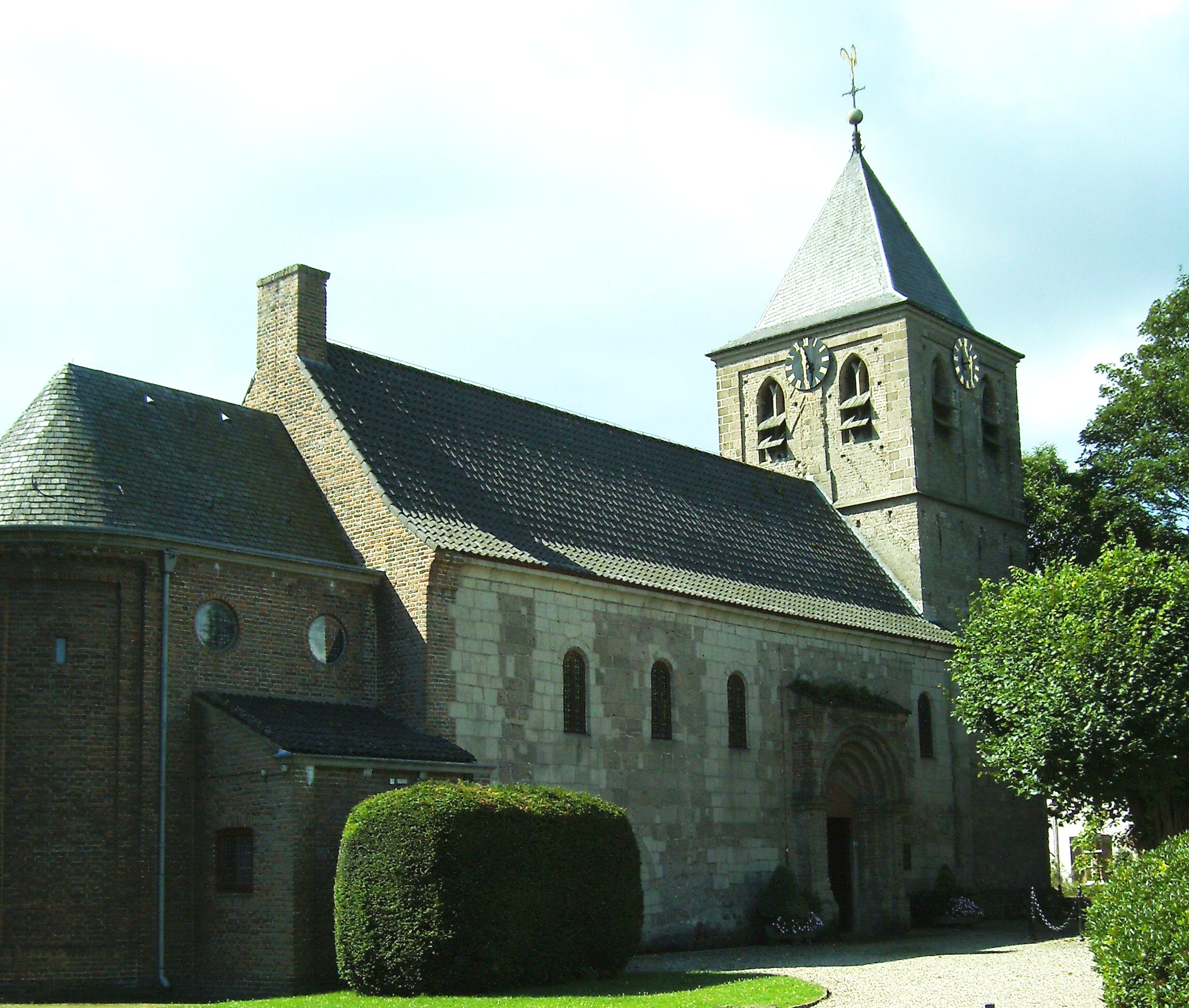
Oldest existing church in the Netherlands (Oosterbeek)

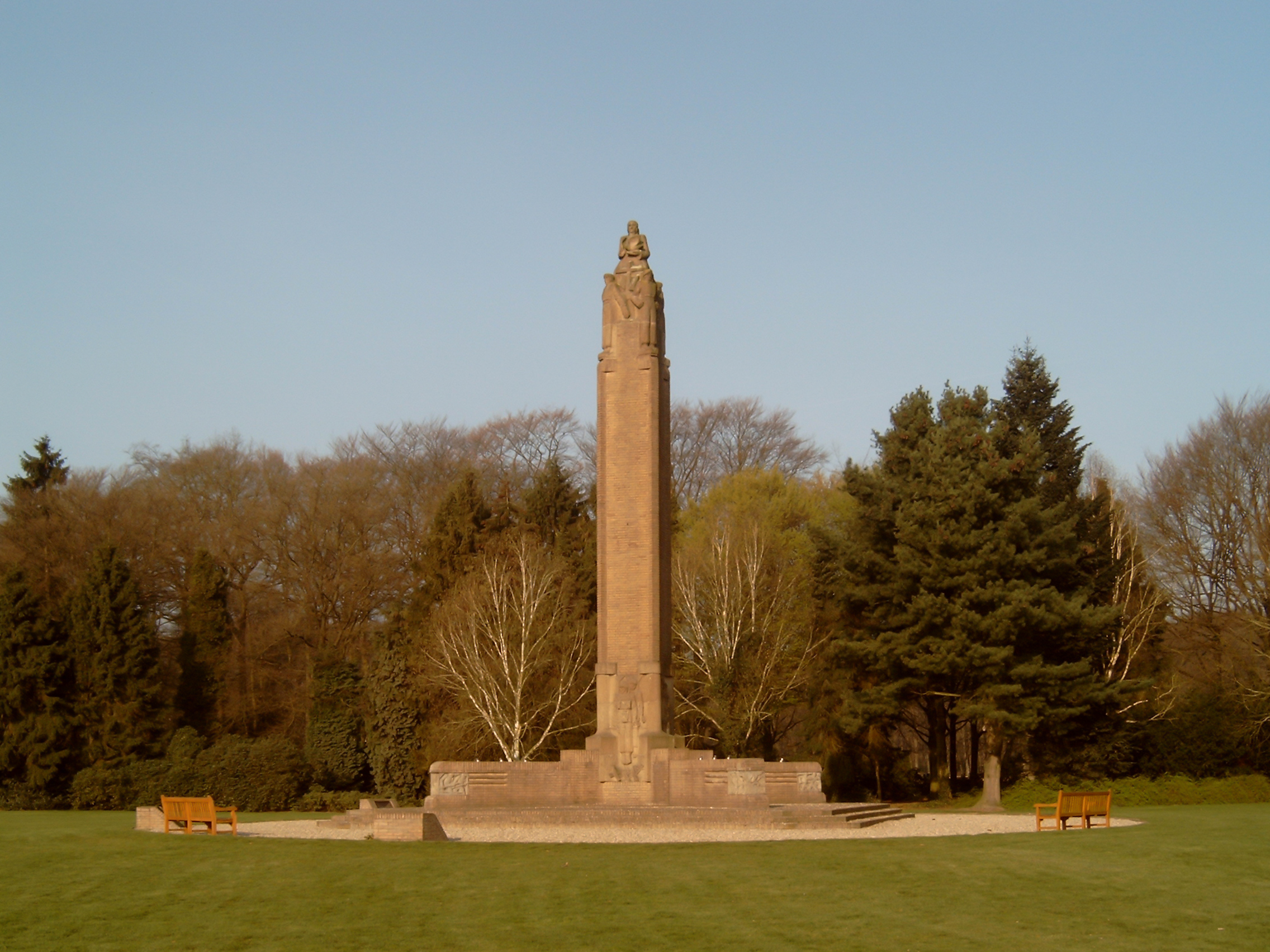
War memorial at Oosterbeek
