= Heelsum =

- Village
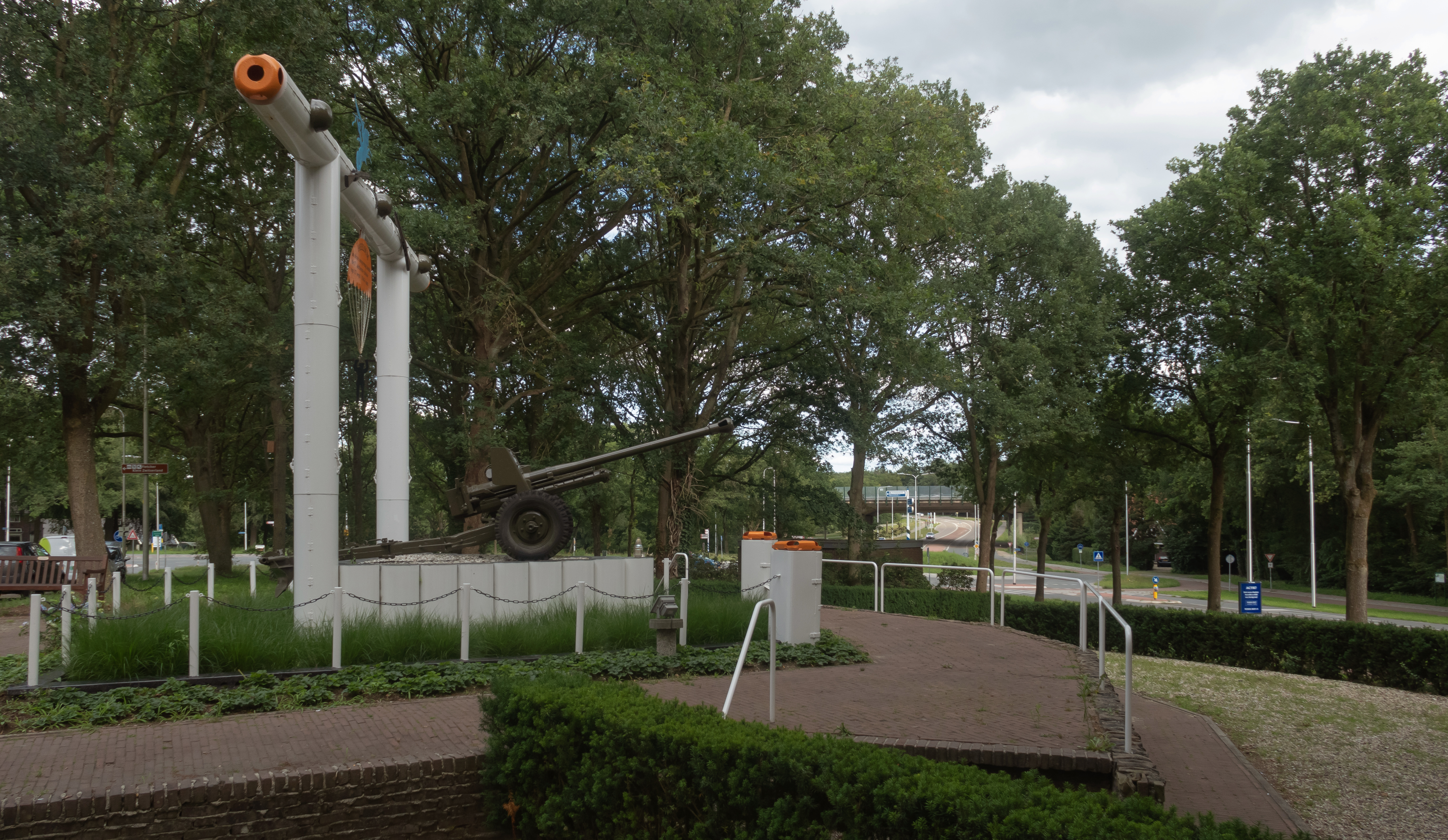
- War memorial

- Location in the province of Gelderland in the Netherlands Heelsum (Netherlands)
- Coordinates: 51°58′56″N 5°45′9″E
- Country: Netherlands
- Province: Gelderland
- Municipality: Renkum

Government
  - Body: Renkum Municipal council
  - Mayor: Mrs. A.M.J. (Agnes) Schaap

Area
  - Total: 3.55 km^{2} (1.37 sq mi)
- Elevation: 25 m (82 ft)

Population (2021)
  - Total: 3,540
  - Density: 997/km^{2} (2,580/sq mi)
- Time zone: UTC+1 (CET)
  - Summer (DST): UTC+2 (CEST)
- Postal code: 6866
- Dialing code: 0317

Heelsum (Dutch pronunciation: [ˈɦeːlsʏm]) is a village in the Dutch province of Gelderland. It is located in the municipality of Renkum, west of Arnhem.

Part of the Battle of Arnhem was fought in and around Heelsum. The initial British landings were carried out just north of the village.

== History ==
The village was first mentioned around 1160 as in Helessem, and means "settlement of Hele (person)". Helsum is an esdorp which developed in the Middle Ages near the brook Heelsumse beek. It became a separate parish in 1517.

The Dutch Reformed church was built in 1517 by the lady of the castle Margaretha van Homoet. It was expanded in 1859. The Catholic community wanted an own church as well. On 1 April 1950 they announced plans to build a church, however, the municipality preferred villas at the location. The church was finally constructed in 1961, however it was decommissioned in 2018.

Heelsum was home to 120 people in 1840. Hotel Klein Zwitserland (Little Switzerland) was built in 1905 in Swiss chalet style in the middle of Wilhelmina park.

On 17 September 1944, the 1st Airborne Division was dropped in Heelsum near Oosterbeek. The landing was unopposed, however, they ran into an armoured tank division of the Germans on the way to Arnhem. On 9 September 1945, the Airborne monument was revealed in Heelsum.

Heelsum and Renkum have formed a single urban area, however, both are considered separate villages.

== Gallery ==
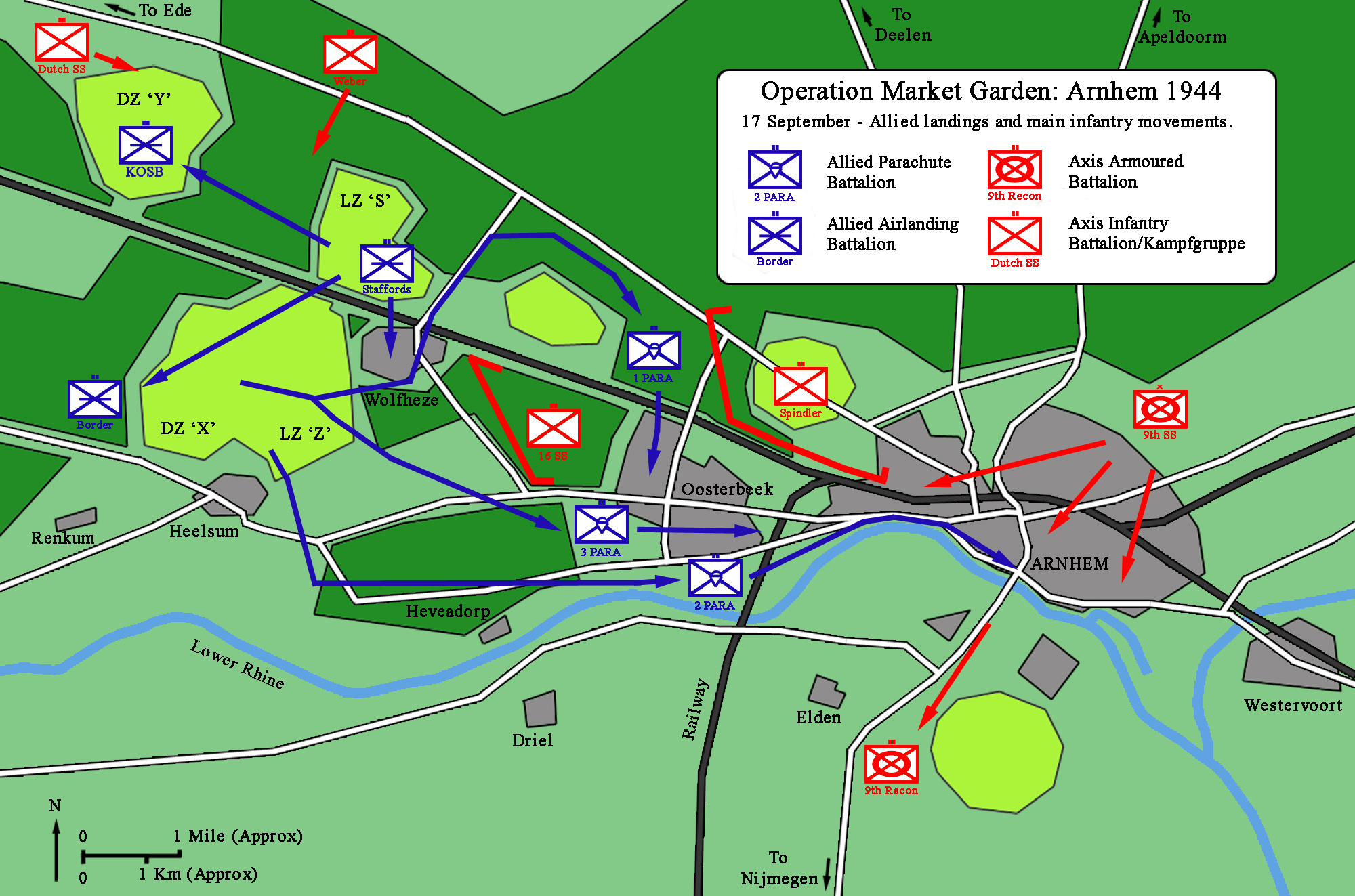
Map showing the landingzone just north of Heelsum

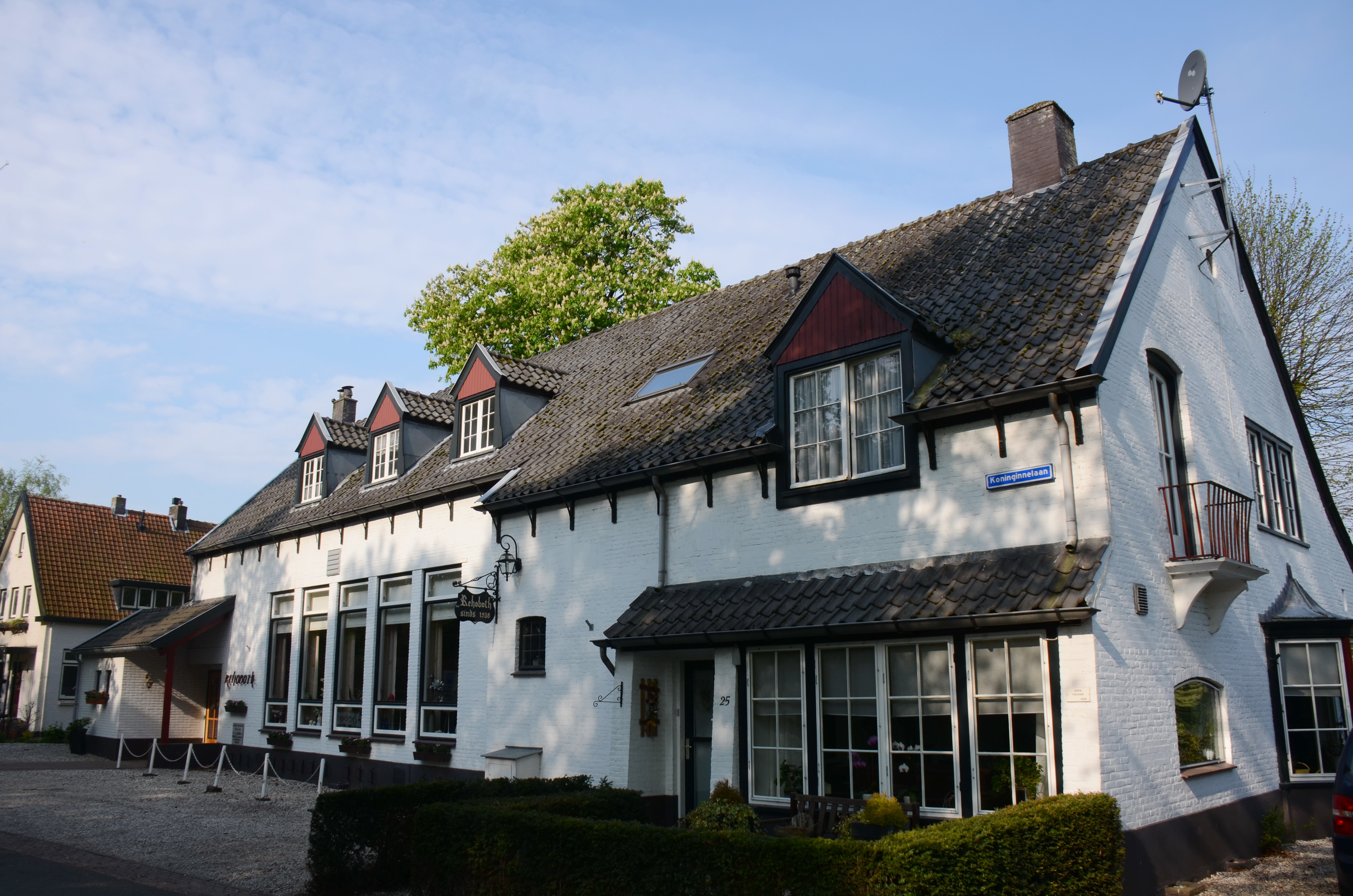
Restaurant/party centre

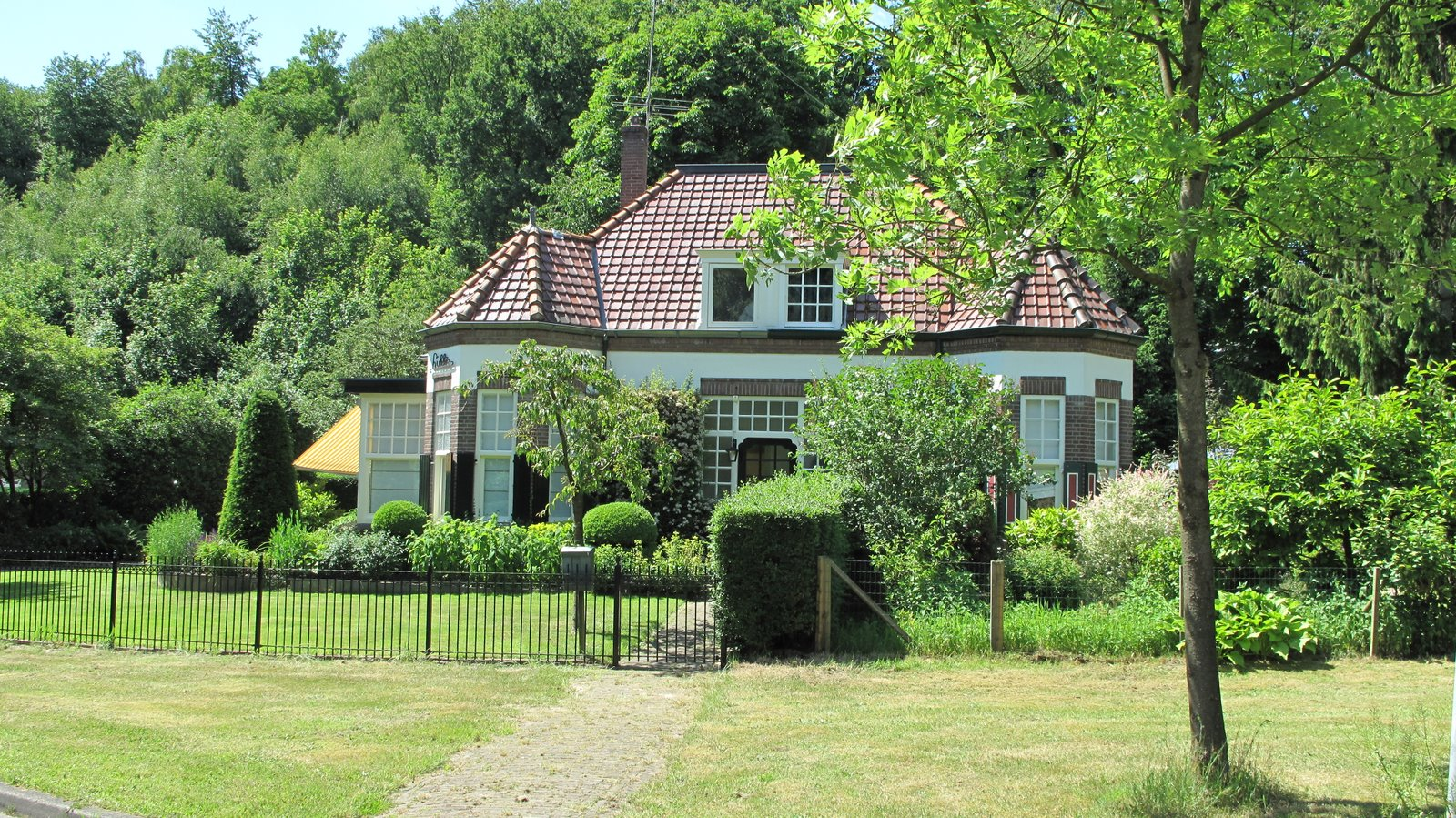
Villa in Heelsum

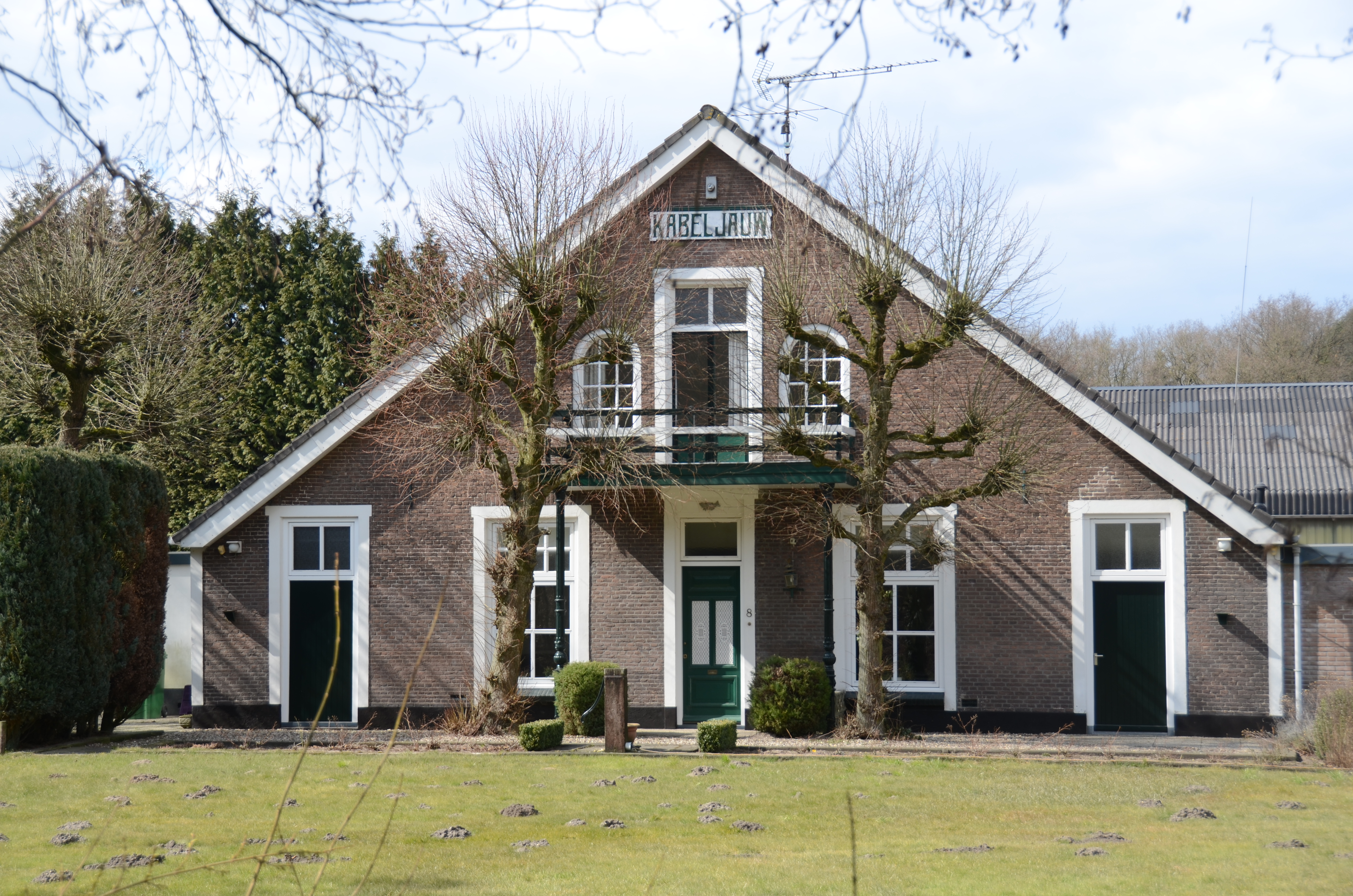
Farm Kabeljauw (Cod fish)
