= Xan de Waard =

Dutch field hockey player (born 1995)

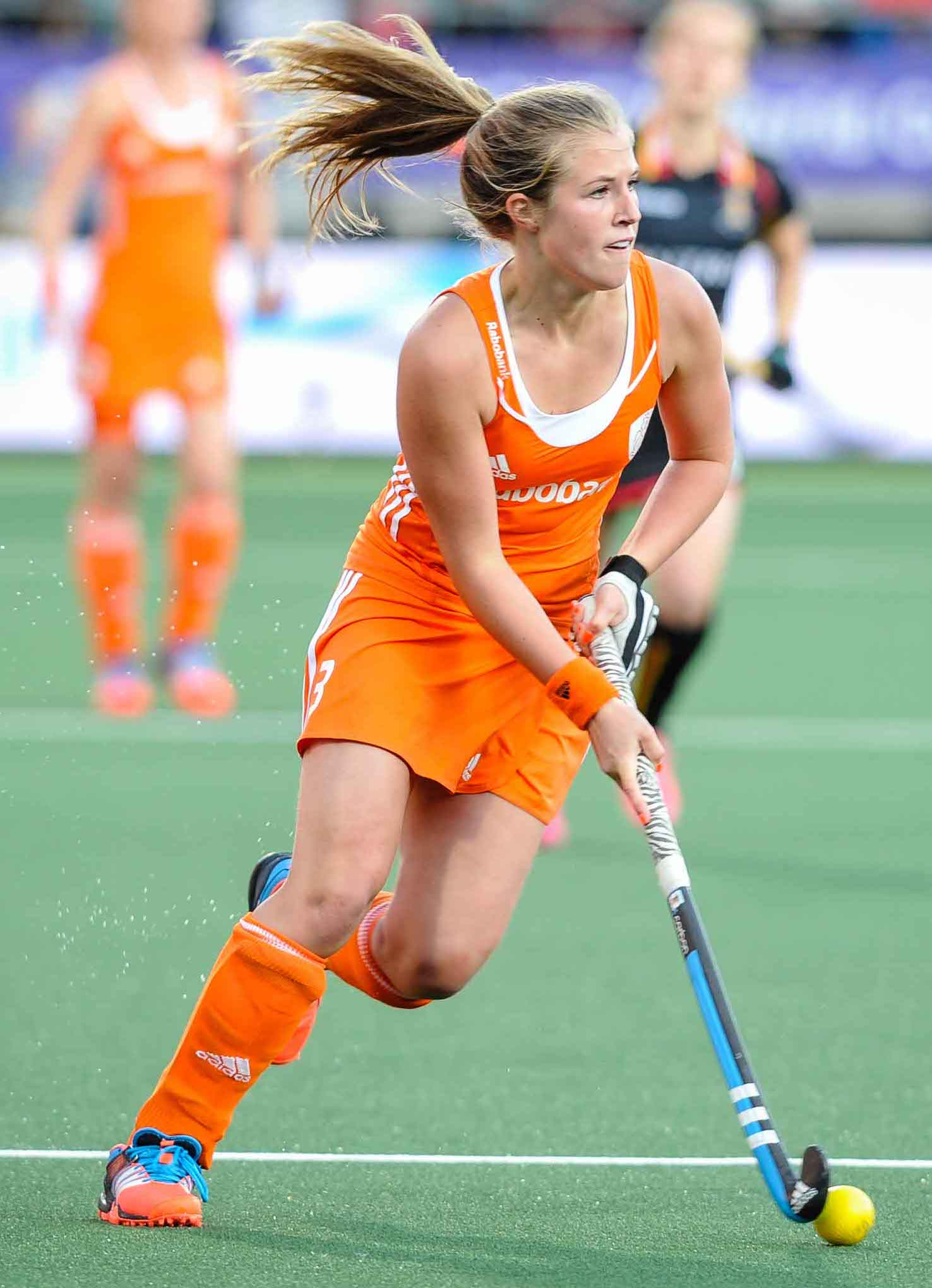
- De Waard in 2014

Personal information
- Born: 8 November 1995 (age 30) Renkum, Netherlands
- Height: 1.63 m (5 ft 4 in)
- Weight: 55 kg (121 lb)

Sport
- Sport: Field hockey
- Position: Midfielder
- Club: SCHC
National team
Years	Team	Caps	Goals
2012–	Netherlands	231	(22)
Medal record
Olympic Games
Gold medal – first place	2020 Tokyo	Team
Gold medal – first place	2024 Paris	Team
Silver medal – second place	2016 Rio de Janeiro	Team
World Cup
Gold medal – first place	2014 The Hague
Gold medal – first place	2018 London
Silver medal – second place	2026 Wavre/Amstelveen
Gold medal – first place	2022 Terrassa/Amstelveen
European Championship
Gold medal – first place	2017 Amstelveen
Gold medal – first place	2019 Antwerp
Gold medal – first place	2023 Mönchengladbach
Gold medal – first place	2025 Mönchengladbach
Silver medal – second place	2015 London
Champions Trophy
Gold medal – first place	2018 Changzhou
Silver medal – second place	2016 London
Bronze medal – third place	2014 Mendoza

Xan de Waard (born 8 November 1995) is a Dutch field hockey player. She received the FIH Player of the Year Award two times in her career, in 2023 and 2025.

De Waard made her debut for the Netherlands national field hockey team on 4 February 2013 in a match against Australia. In that same year, she was also selected for the Hockey World League and subsequently included in the final squad for the 2014 World Cup in The Hague. With the Dutch national team, where she usually plays as a midfielder, De Waard became a two-time Olympic champion (2020, 2024), a three-time world champion (2014, 2018, 2022) and a four-time European champion (2017, 2019, 2023, 2025). In 2023, she became captain of the Dutch team, after having shared the captaincy with Pien Sanders and Marloes Keetels the year before.

De Waard has played over 230 international matches for the Dutch national team.
