= John Waddy (British Army officer) =

British military officer (1920–2020)

Colonel John Waddy OBE
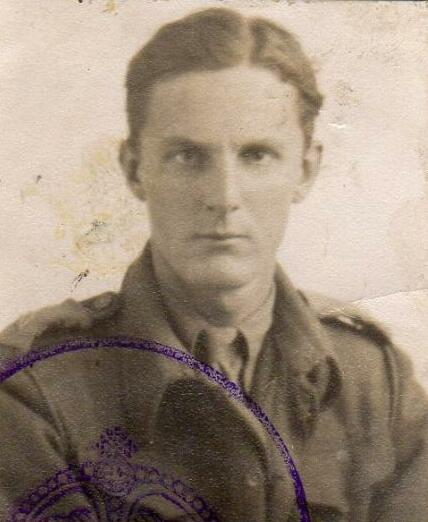
- John Waddy in the 1940s
- Born: 17 June 1920; Taunton, Somerset, England
- Died: 27 September 2020 (aged 100); Taunton, Somerset, England
- Military career
- Allegiance: United Kingdom
- Branch: British Army
- Service years: 1939–1974
- Rank: Colonel
- Service number: 95593
- Units: Somerset Light Infantry; Parachute Regiment; Special Air Service
- Commands: Director SAS
- Conflicts: Second World War; Palestine Emergency; Malayan Emergency
- Awards: Officer of the Order of the British Empire; Mentioned in Despatches
- Other work: Author; Military advisor

Colonel John Llewellyn Waddy, OBE (17 June 1920 – 27 September 2020) was a British Army officer who served during the Second World War, in Palestine and during the Malayan Emergency, before becoming Colonel of the SAS.

Joining the British Army shortly before the Second World War, he initially served with the Somerset Light Infantry in India. He subsequently volunteered for the Parachute Regiment and saw action in the Italian Campaign in late 1943. After returning to the United Kingdom with the 4th Parachute Brigade, part of the 1st Airborne Division, he took part in the Battle of Arnhem, where he was wounded and taken prisoner by German troops.

After the war, Waddy remained in the army and saw action in the Mandatory Palestine and during the Malayan Emergency, for which he was Mentioned in Despatches. He went on to hold a series of command posts with the Parachute Regiment, both at home and overseas, and was made an Officer of the Order of the British Empire in 1963. He was an early incumbent in the post of Colonel SAS and did much to expand the Special Air Service's role. He subsequently held a number of military advisor positions, most notably in Washington DC, Vietnam, and after resigning from the military, with Westland Helicopters and during the filming of the movie A Bridge Too Far.

== Early life ==
John Waddy was born on 17 June 1920 in Taunton, Somerset, the son of Lieutenant Colonel Richard Henry Waddy and his wife Llewellyn. He was educated at Wellington College, Berkshire, and then as a cadet at Royal Military College, Sandhurst.

== Second World War ==
=== North Africa and Italy ===
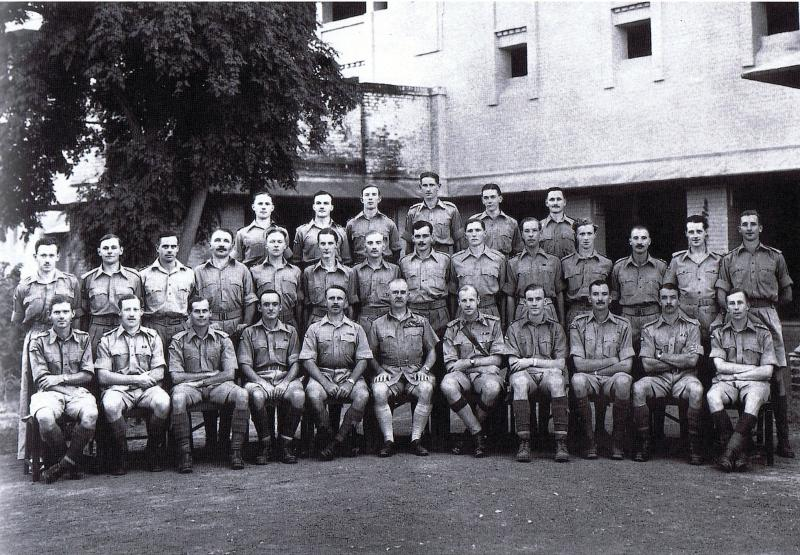
Officers of the 151st Parachute Battalion in India, 1942. Captain Waddy is stood in the second row, sixth from the left.

On 3 July 1939, Waddy was commissioned into the Somerset Light Infantry as a second lieutenant and sent to India two months later with the 1st Battalion, then commanded by Lieutenant Colonel John Harding. After travelling from Taunton to Scotland he sailed from Britain on the same day that Britain declared war on Germany. He was promoted to acting, then temporary, captain from September 1940, and substantive lieutenant on 3 January 1941. His time in India, however, was mostly spent on exercises with little chance of action. Desperate to leave, Waddy successfully volunteered for a new British parachute battalion when the chance came in August 1941, and in October joined the 151st Parachute Battalion as their intelligence officer. Parachuting was rudimentary in India and training jumps were made from Vickers Valentia biplanes. He qualified for his jump wings on the same day that Japan attacked Pearl Harbor, although only two months later he was nearly killed in a training jump and spent three days in a coma.

In October 1942 the battalion was sent to North Africa and re-designated 156th Parachute Battalion, where it became the central unit of the new 4th Parachute Brigade, formed in December. Waddy was briefly made adjutant of the battalion, but quickly moved up to the post of the 4th Brigade's intelligence officer. The brigade moved from Egypt to Palestine in February 1943, and to Tunisia in June where it joined the 1st Airborne Division, then commanded by Major General George Hopkinson. Waddy recalled that the introduction of the now-famous maroon beret was particularly unpopular with the 156th Battalion, who had previously worn bush hats. The 4th Brigade did not take part in the Allied invasion of Sicily but on 5 September the whole Division sailed to Taranto in Italy (Operation Slapstick), successfully capturing the port with 156th Battalion and brigade HQ in the vanguard.

The division advanced northwards over the coming weeks, slowly pursuing the 1st German Parachute Division. In one action Waddy found an Italian 179mm Howitzer which he used to disperse Germans gathering to counterattack the 156th Battalion's positions, firing through open sights at a building in the centre of their front. Waddy was promoted to acting major in October and took charge of the 156th Battalion's B Company, a month before the 1st Airborne Division was withdrawn and sailed back to the United Kingdom, arriving there in December. On 24 January 1944, he was made a war substantive captain and temporary major.

=== Arnhem ===
1st Airborne Division's next deployment was in September 1944 during Operation Market Garden. The Allies planned to use airborne forces to secure key bridges over a number of rivers and canals in the Netherlands, opening a route around the Siegfried Line and into the heart of Germany. 1st Airborne Division was tasked with securing bridges across the Lower Rhine at Arnhem and 4th Parachute Brigade was detailed to occupy the northern approaches of the city in the event of a counterattack by German forces. The brigade was scheduled to arrive on the second day of the operation, 18 September, using drop zones protected by elements of 1st Airlanding Brigade. In the event, ground mist in England meant that the second lift was delayed by four hours, which spared the Dakota transport aircraft from meeting Luftwaffe fighters over the drop zone. Nevertheless, the aircraft encountered considerable anti-aircraft fire as they approached the drop zone. Waddy later recalled that his aircraft was so near to the ground that he could see the upturned faces of the German gun crews. He observed numerous flak bursts and watched the escorting Hawker Typhoon fighters attacking flak batteries as they approached the DZ. His own aircraft was hit in the tail but the pilot continued to the drop zone where, despite bad yawing, Waddy and his men were able to jump. The paratroopers came under small-arms fire directed at the aircraft's doors as they left the aircraft and parachuted under heavy fire onto Ginkel Heath. Waddy's signaller lost his radio as he jumped behind him; the bulky equipment was hit by a round the moment he jumped out of the Dakota.

On the ground, an irate captain, who had expected the men four hours earlier, explained to a shocked Waddy the rapidly deteriorating situation on the ground. With 11th Parachute Battalion despatched to Arnhem and 10th Parachute Battalion defending the wounded on the drop zone, only 156th Battalion was free to move. At about 5 pm they moved off along the Utrecht–Arnhem railway and met their glider-borne elements at Wolfheze just before being strafed by a German fighter. Approaching Oosterbeek they encountered German Panzer troops and stopped for the night.

In the morning, fresh orders were issued to lead the 4th Brigade to the left flank of 1st Parachute Brigade. B Company were ordered to provide supporting fire from the flanks of A Company's advance, which they successfully did before returning to battalion HQ and following up the advance. Lieutenant Colonel Sir Richard des Voeux ordered Waddy to take B Company through A Company's positions and continue the advance to the high ground, believing that there was not much opposition. In fact A Company had been nearly destroyed, and Waddy passed numerous bodies on his way forward. As the company advanced, they were held up by what Waddy believed was a twin barrelled 20mm flak gun. He led a small group to attack it, but was spotted by a German sniper as they moved forward. A companion was killed instantly and Waddy, without his machine gun, could only fire ineffectively with his pistol. The sniper shot him in the groin and tried to hit him again as he started to crawl away, forcing Waddy to lie doggo for a moment before one of his men, a 6 foot 4 inches (1.93 m) tall Rhodesian soldier, carried him back to Company HQ. Faced with a heavy concentration of enemy armour, the attack stalled and was then called off; the battalion had taken such heavy casualties that it was reduced essentially to the size of a single company.

At the Regimental Aid Post, Waddy found that the doctors did not rate his chances particularly highly; the 156 Battalion's war diary even recorded that "B Company commander was fatally wounded". He was taken next to a Field Ambulance post and from there to the Tafelburg hotel in Oosterbeek, now being used as a main dressing station. Here he was operated on in the hotel's billiard room where Major Guy Rigby Jones used the billiard table to perform surgery. A day later he was moved to a house opposite as the number of casualties increased. Because the aid stations were in the front lines of the Oosterbeek perimeter, they came under constant fire and he was wounded twice more. A mortar round shell fragment lodged in his left foot, and a later hit caused splinter injuries to his face and shoulder. On another occasion, as the battle seesawed around the aid post, Germans occupied his building. A British sniper shot a German rifleman, prompting a German sergeant to lecture the British about shooting at a Red Cross house. When the house caught fire he was taken outside and driven to a collection point from where German medics took him to Apeldoorn.

Waddy spent the next six weeks in a German hospital in Apeldoorn. Once again the British patients were lectured about firing at the Red Cross after a Spitfire strafed the operating theatre, but overall Waddy was impressed by the kindness of the German staff and guards. He narrowly avoided having his foot amputated when a nurse removed the splinter embedded in it with a pair of forceps, and once he had sufficiently recovered from his wounds he was taken to Stalag VII-A where he remained until the camp was liberated at the end of April 1945.

== Post-war service ==
Waddy remained in the army after the war ended and joined the HQ of 3rd Parachute Brigade before being sent to Palestine in September 1945. A month later he joined the 9th Battalion dealing with the Jewish terrorist threat and in July 1947 he was wounded once again, this time by members of the IZL. Because the Parachute Regiment was not allowed to recruit officers for longer than three years, Waddy was posted in March 1948, after almost seven years with the regiment. He spent the next four years in staff posts, initially in Greece, then Taunton where he became GSO 3 for 43rd (Wessex) Infantry Division. Later he was sent to 1st Infantry Division in Egypt and then Libya. In July 1952, he was promoted to substantive major, and two months later was posted to Malaya as a company commander with the 1st Battalion, The Somerset Light Infantry. He spent a year in the country during the Malayan Emergency and was Mentioned in Despatches.

Returning from Malaya, Waddy spent time at RAF Staff College and as a training major for the Somerset Light Infantry Territorial Army Battalion. He then volunteered to rejoin the Parachute Regiment and was sent to the Canadian Joint Air Training Centre in Manitoba, Canada, on exchange. In 1958 the Parachute Regiment was allowed to keep its own officers and Waddy swiftly applied. He was posted to Jordan and then Cyprus as 2IC of 2nd Battalion, an experience he likened to being back with family. In 1960 he was promoted to lieutenant colonel and posted to Aldershot to command the Depot The Parachute Regiment and Airborne Forces during which time he established the Parachute Regiment Battle Camp at Brecon, which later evolved into the Infantry Battle School. In 1962 he became chief instructor at a small arms school in Hythe. In the 1963 New Year Honours he was appointed Officer of the Order of the British Empire for his command of the depot.

In late 1964, Waddy took up a new post as Colonel SAS, which later evolved into Director SAS (now Director Special Forces), resulting in his promotion to full colonel. Waddy was an early incumbent of this post and is credited with doing much to develop new roles for the SAS in the post-colonial war period. He also wrote a paper envisaging counter-terrorism and intelligence gathering roles for the service, predictions that have since been realised.

After brief stints in Washington D.C. and Fort Benning as a liaison officer, Waddy was posted to the British Embassy in Saigon as a defence advisor in 1970. Here he was able to witness the Vietnam War first hand before returning to Britain in 1972 and joining the Joint Warfare Establishment at Old Sarum near Salisbury in Wiltshire.

== Civilian service ==
Waddy resigned his commission in 1974 and became military advisor to Westland Helicopters, a post he held until his retirement in 1989. Although he found the work stimulating, Waddy was frustrated by the Army's lack of interest in the helicopter.

When production of the movie A Bridge Too Far began in 1975, Waddy was given six months leave by Westland to act as chief Military Advisor, an appointment that John Frost thought was ideal. Waddy was responsible for training "Attenborough's Private Army", a group of fifty men who went through boot camp in order to portray Frost's men at Arnhem Bridge and provide the backbone of the extra cast. Waddy confessed to being deeply concerned by the actors' quality at first, but was able to turn them into men who looked and acted the part. Although there was little that Waddy or his fellow military consultants (who included Frost, Roy Urquhart, James M. Gavin, Brian Horrocks and J. O. E. Vandeleur) could do to greatly influence the film's script, he was able to ensure that some parts were kept historically accurate. By way of thanking him after receiving some advice, Edward Fox referred to his driver as Waddy in his first scene in the movie, and he had a brief cameo appearance in one of the film's final scenes.

Along with many veterans, Waddy returned to Arnhem frequently. When visiting in 1954 he was presented with a damaged silver cigarette case bearing his surname. When he had it cleaned at home he discovered it was a present from his father to Colonel Hilaro Barlow, another 1st Airborne officer who was killed during the battle.

From 1982 to 1996 Waddy led talks for students of the Army Staff College on their battlefield tours at Arnhem, a role he reprised when the Defence Academy restarted the tours in 2008. He wrote a book on the subject in 1999 (A Tour of the Arnhem Battlefields) and was widely recognised as an authority on the battle.

By the time of his 100th birthday in June 2020, Waddy was the last surviving officer from the Battle of Arnhem. He celebrated his birthday at his home in Taunton, with visits from the Parachute Regiment and the Deputy Defence Attaché from the embassy of the Kingdom of the Netherlands, who presented Waddy with the Dutch Thank You Liberators Medaille. Waddy died in his sleep on 27 September 2020.

== Bibliography ==
- Davies, Barry (1998). The Complete Encyclopaedia of the SAS. Virgin. ISBN 1-85227-707-6.
- Buckingham, William F. (2002). Arnhem 1944. Tempus Publishing. ISBN 0-7524-3187-0.
- Frost, Major General John (1980). A Drop Too Many. Cassell. ISBN 0-85052-927-1.
- Kemp, Anthony (1994). The SAS: Savage Wars of Peace – 1947 to the Present. Penguin. ISBN 0-14-139081-6.
- Margry, Karel (2002). Operation Market Garden Then and Now: Volume 2. After the Battle. ISBN 1-870067-45-2.
- Middlebrook, Martin (1994). Arnhem 1944: The Airborne Battle. Viking. ISBN 0-670-83546-3.
- Ryan, Cornelius (1974). A Bridge Too Far. Coronet. ISBN 0-340-19941-5.
- Thompson, Major-General Julian (1990). Ready for Anything: The Parachute Regiment at War. Fontana. ISBN 0-00-637505-7.
- Waddy, John (1999). A Tour of the Arnhem Battlefields. Pen & Sword Books Limited. ISBN 0-85052-571-3.
- Waddy, John (1986). "The Making of A Bridge Too Far". After the Battle – Arnhem (Special Issue): 30–52.
- Waddy, John; Kershaw, Bob. "Paradata Media: Colonel John Waddy, OBE" (Audio Archive). Airborne Forces Museum.
