= Richard Lonsdale =

British Army officer (1913–1988)

Richard Thomas Henry Lonsdale
- Born: 27 December 1913; Manorhamilton, County Leitrim, Ireland
- Died: 23 November 1988 (aged 74); Bath, Somerset, England
- Burial place: Aldershot Military Cemetery, Hampshire, England
- Military career
- Allegiance: United Kingdom
- Branch: British Army
- Service years: 1936–1951
- Rank: Lieutenant Colonel
- Nickname: "Dickie"
- Service number: 69129
- Units: Leicestershire Regiment; Parachute Regiment
- Commands: 3rd Parachute Battalion
- Conflicts: World War II; Palestine Emergency
- Awards: Distinguished Service Order & Bar; Military Cross

Lieutenant Colonel Richard Thomas Henry Lonsdale, DSO & Bar, MC (27 December 1913 – 23 November 1988) was an officer of the British Army who served with the Parachute Regiment throughout much of the Second World War.

Born in December 1913, Lonsdale initially entered the British Army in the 1930s as a private before attending Royal Military College, Sandhurst and being commissioned as an officer in the Leicestershire Regiment. In 1938, while serving with his regiment in Waziristan, he was awarded the Military Cross (MC). After the outbreak of the Second World War he was a founding member of the 151st Battalion of the Parachute Regiment in India. By 1943 he had been promoted to lead A Company of the 2nd Battalion, Parachute Regiment and served with distinction in the Allied invasion of Sicily. After returning to England he was made second in command of the 11th Battalion, Parachute Regiment in 1944, shortly before flying to Arnhem with the rest of the 4th Parachute Brigade and 1st Airborne Division. Here he again served with distinction during the Battle of Arnhem, and despite being wounded he took command of a mixed force that successfully defended the Allied perimeter against repeated German attacks. He was awarded the Distinguished Service Order (DSO) twice, for his actions in Sicily and Arnhem.

After the war Lonsdale remained with the army and took command of the 3rd Parachute Battalion. He later served with the King's African Rifles in Uganda before he retired from the army in 1951. He died in November 1988.

== Early life ==
Richard Lonsdale was born on 27 December 1913 and educated at Eastbourne College in East Sussex. He initially enlisted in the British Army as a private, but on 27 August 1936 he was commissioned as a second lieutenant into the Leicestershire Regiment after attending the Royal Military College, Sandhurst. He served with both the 2nd and 1st Battalions of his regiment in Jubbulpore, British India in 1937, and in Waziristan in 1938. In Waziristan he took part in a successful operation to recapture an enemy-held picket and was subsequently awarded the Military Cross (MC).

== Second World War ==
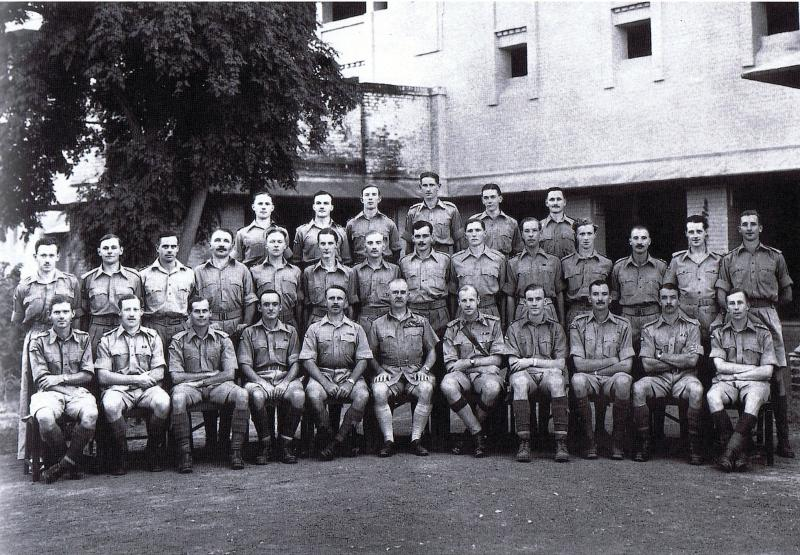
Officers of the 151st Parachute Battalion in India, 1942. Major Lonsdale is sat in the front row, second from the left.

Lonsdale was promoted to the rank of lieutenant only a month before the outbreak of war. He occasionally held the rank of acting or temporary captain over the next few years before he volunteered for the Parachute Regiment in 1941. Like John Waddy he was a founding member of the 151st Parachute Battalion of the Parachute Regiment in India, and remained with the battalion when it transferred to North Africa. In July 1943 he was transferred and made the commanding officer of A Company, 2nd Parachute Battalion, part of the 1st Parachute Brigade.

=== Sicily ===
In mid-1943, the 1st Airborne Division, to which the 1st Parachute Brigade was attached, was given the task of conducting three airborne assaults as part of Operation Husky, the Allied invasion of Sicily. Each assault would be conducted by one of the division's brigades. The Ponte Grande road bridge south of Syracuse was to be captured by the 1st Airlanding Brigade, the port of Augusta was to be seized by the 2nd Parachute Brigade, and finally the Primasole Bridge over the River Simeto was to be taken and secured by the 1st Parachute Brigade. The 1st Parachute Brigade's plan for the capture of Primasole Bridge, code-named Operation Fustian, was quite simple: the 1st Parachute Battalion would capture the bridge itself, the 2nd Parachute Battalion would drop to the south of the bridge and prevent Axis forces from counter-attacking, and the 3rd Parachute Battalion would do the same to the north.

The 2nd Parachute Battalion was charged with securing three areas of high ground to the south of Primosole Bridge, codenamed Johnny I, II, and III. When the brigade was dropped around its objectives on the night of 13 July, Lonsdale and the majority of his company were amongst the few to be accurately dropped onto their zones, while the rest of the brigade were scattered over a large area. He was able to join Lieutenant Colonel John Frost and was confident that he could secure Johnny I with his own company. Frost led a mixed force of about 100 men to "Johnny I" but on arrival there they discovered that a small force under Lieutenant Tony Frank, of A Company had not only captured the hill, but also taken 130 Italian prisoners. Lonsdale deployed his men on "Johnny I" and Frost, who had injured his knee in the drop, passed command of the objective to him.

Lonsdale later led a small group of paratroopers towards "Johnny II" but came under fire from German troops and withdrew. For the next few hours the men on "Johnny I" were able to see German forces preparing to assault the battalion, but without any machine guns or mortars, they were unable to disrupt their preparations, or respond to the German's own mortar fire. Several attacks were launched, but all came from the same direction, and Lonsdale and his company were able to repel them. The grass on the top of "Johnny I" was soon set alight by German fire, and the battalion was forced to shrink its perimeter, although it was able to stop German attacks by mid-morning thanks to heavy naval fire from a British cruiser off the shore of Sicily. By dusk 3rd Parachute Battalion to the north had been forced to retreat after suffering heavy casualties and facing repeated German assaults, and the surviving paratroopers began moving towards 2nd Parachute Battalion's positions; at the same time, Lonsdale managed to make contact with M4 Sherman tanks from 44th Royal Tank Regiment, part of the British 4th Armoured Brigade, who had advanced from the British beachheads. As the 3rd Parachute Battalion troops reached his company's positions, Lonsdale was instrumental in gathering them together and ensuring they did not retreat any further. The brigade was withdrawn from Primasole Bridge to Syracuse on the morning of 14 July, and from there back to North Africa.

For his conduct during this operation, Lonsdale was awarded the Distinguished Service Order. His citation read:

For most conspicuous gallantry and leadership in action. On the night of the 13th of July 1943 this officer was in command of a Company of the 2nd Battalion Parachute Regiment, which was dropped on the Catania Plain in Sicily to secure the high ground South of the River Simeto. On reaching the objective this officer took over command of the Battalion as the Commanding Officer was injured, and at dawn on the 14th of July 1943 German Parachute Troops launched a heavy counter-attack on the Battalion positions. This officer by his example, leadership and complete contempt for danger when under very heavy enemy fire, so skillfully directed the defence of the objective gained and in spite of sustaining heavy casualties, that the position was held and heavy casualties were inflicted on the enemy, including the taking and retention of 450 enemy prisoners, until relieved by our own troops.

=== Battle of Arnhem ===
After briefly landing in Italy as part of Operation Slapstick, and then participating in the early stages of the Allied campaign in Italy, most of the 1st Airborne Division returned to the United Kingdom in November 1943 and were kept in reserve during Operation Overlord but were never used. In September Lonsdale was made second-in-command of the 11th Parachute Battalion and in the same month the division was deployed in Operation Market Garden. The Allies planned to use airborne forces to secure key bridges over a number of rivers and canals in the Netherlands, opening a route around the Siegfried Line and into the heart of Germany. The 1st Airborne Division was tasked with securing bridges across the Lower Rhine at Arnhem, with the 4th Parachute Brigade planned to drop on the second day of the operation.

The divisional commander, Major General Roy Urquhart, had an original plan which envisaged the 4th Parachute Brigade advancing to the north of Arnhem, but by the end of day one the advance into Arnhem had stalled. Only a small group of the 1st Parachute Brigade, mainly elements of Lieutenant Colonel John Frost's 2nd Battalion, were able to reach the bridge. The 1st and 3rd battalions were unable to penetrate the outer suburbs of the city and their advance stalled, so in order to support them elements of the 2nd Battalion, South Staffordshire Regiment, glider infantry of the 1st Airlanding Brigade, were sent forward on the morning of 18 September. When the second lift arrived later that day the remaining companies of the South Staffords and the 11th Battalion were sent forward and arrived at the outskirts of Arnhem that night.

Lonsdale did not advance with the battalion however. The C-47 Dakota in which Lonsdale was travelling was hit by German anti-aircraft fire, damaging it and also wounding Londsdale in his right hand; he was delayed in exiting the aircraft when the two men either side of him refused to jump, which meant they had to be unhooked before he and the rest of his stick could jump out of the aircraft. Upon landing, Lonsdale found that his wound was bleeding considerably, and his orderly had to bandage up his hand.

==== Lonsdale Force ====
In the early hours of the morning of 19 September, an attack was launched on a narrow front between the river and the railway line, in order to force a passage through to the bridge. However, in the face of strong enemy positions and armour, the attack faltered and the British routed. The remnants of the four battalions fell back in disarray to the main divisional positions at Oosterbeek. Here they were met by Lieutenant Colonel Sheriff Thompson, CO of the 1st Airlanding Light Regiment, who drove a little over half a mile forward of his own 75 Millimetre Howitzers positions at Oosterbeek Church, and ordered Major Robert Cain to gather the men into defensive units. Thompson asked Brigadier Pip Hicks, commanding the 1st Airlanding Brigade of the division, for more men and officers, and was sent Lonsdale and Major Simmons. While Simmons organised defences at the church, Thompson sent Lonsdale forward to take charge of the outlying force. This sector was officially designated Thompson Force in a divisional meeting the following day.

On 20 September, the Germans launched a series of increasingly heavy attacks against Lonsdale's men. Although in an isolated position they held their ground throughout the day and Lance Sergeant John Baskeyfield was posthumously awarded the Victoria Cross (VC) for his actions on the main road into Oosterbeek. By the afternoon the mixed force was so weakened that Hicks gave Thompson permission to pull them back to the main divisional defence line at the church. German flamethrowers and tank fire had set fire to buildings and the surrounding woodland and the British withdrew under intense fire. Lonsdale ordered the men who had fallen back to gather and rest in the church, and it was here that he gave a speech to rouse his exhausted and dispirited men. Standing with a sling around his injured arm, a blood-stained bandage covering his three head wounds and a bandage on his leg, Lonsdale climbed into the pulpit:

You know as well as I do there are a lot of bloody Germans coming at us. Well, all we can do is to stay here and hang on in the hope that somebody catches us up. We must fight for our lives and stick together. We've fought the Germans before - in North Africa, Sicily, Italy. They weren't good enough for us then, and they're bloody well not good enough for us now. They're up against the finest soldiers in the world. An hour from now you will take up defensive positions north of the road outside. Make certain you dig in well and that your weapons and ammo are in good order. We are getting short of ammo, so when you shoot you shoot to kill. Good luck to you all.

Although many of the men were asleep, the speech put new strength and hope into the men who heard it. Lonsdale took command of the parachute battalions in the sector, while Thompson took charge of the artillery, South Staffords and Glider pilots. However, on 21 September Thompson was injured by mortar fire and Lonsdale took overall command of the sector, which was renamed Lonsdale Force. For several days they fought off determined German attacks in their sector, usually minor infantry encounters. On many mornings Royal Artillery units from XXX Corps, south of the river, laid barrages just forward of the force's positions to disrupt any enemy buildups, on one occasion accidentally shelling their own men. On the morning of Monday 25 September, Urquhart agreed to withdraw his division south of the river, but he would have to wait until nightfall. It was on this day that the Germans made their most significant gains, breaking through the British perimeter at the northern end of Lonsdale Force's sector and sweeping south to the South Staffords positions. The German forces succeeded in overrunning several artillery positions before being forced back. The 1st Airborne withdrew that night, although Lonsdale force were amongst the last to fall back to the river after waiting for the units further north to fall back past them. Nevertheless, they were at the back of the queues to cross the river and many men were left behind. Lonsdale saw as many men over as possible before he left. No boats were running by the time he came to leave and so he swam the river, a task made more difficult by his injuries.

For his conduct during the battle, Lonsdale was awarded a Bar to the DSO on 9 November 1944. His citation read:

At Arnhem on the 20th September, this officer, although wounded in the hand and arm, was given command of the remnants of three Parachute Battalions who had withdrawn from the town. This detachment, about 400 strong, was allotted the task of holding part of the divisional perimeter.

Major Lonsdale so organised and inspired those under him that in spite of repeated attacks by enemy infantry, tanks and self-propelled guns, the positions taken up were subsequently held until the remains of the division withdrew over the River Lek. Throughout this period of six days the positions were continually mortared and shelled.

Major Lonsdale, although again wounded, organised several counter-attacks to regain ground temporarily lost and his personal example and supreme contempt of danger was an inspiration to all those with whom he came in contact. (Note: The British division actually withdrew across the Nederrijn (Lower Rhine) at Oosterbeek. The Nederrijn flows into the River Lek approximately 40 km downstream.)

In 1945 several hundred survivors from the battle had the opportunity to take part in the film Theirs is the Glory, recounting the events at Arnhem. Lonsdale portrayed himself in the film, and once again delivered his rousing speech in the church.

== Later life ==
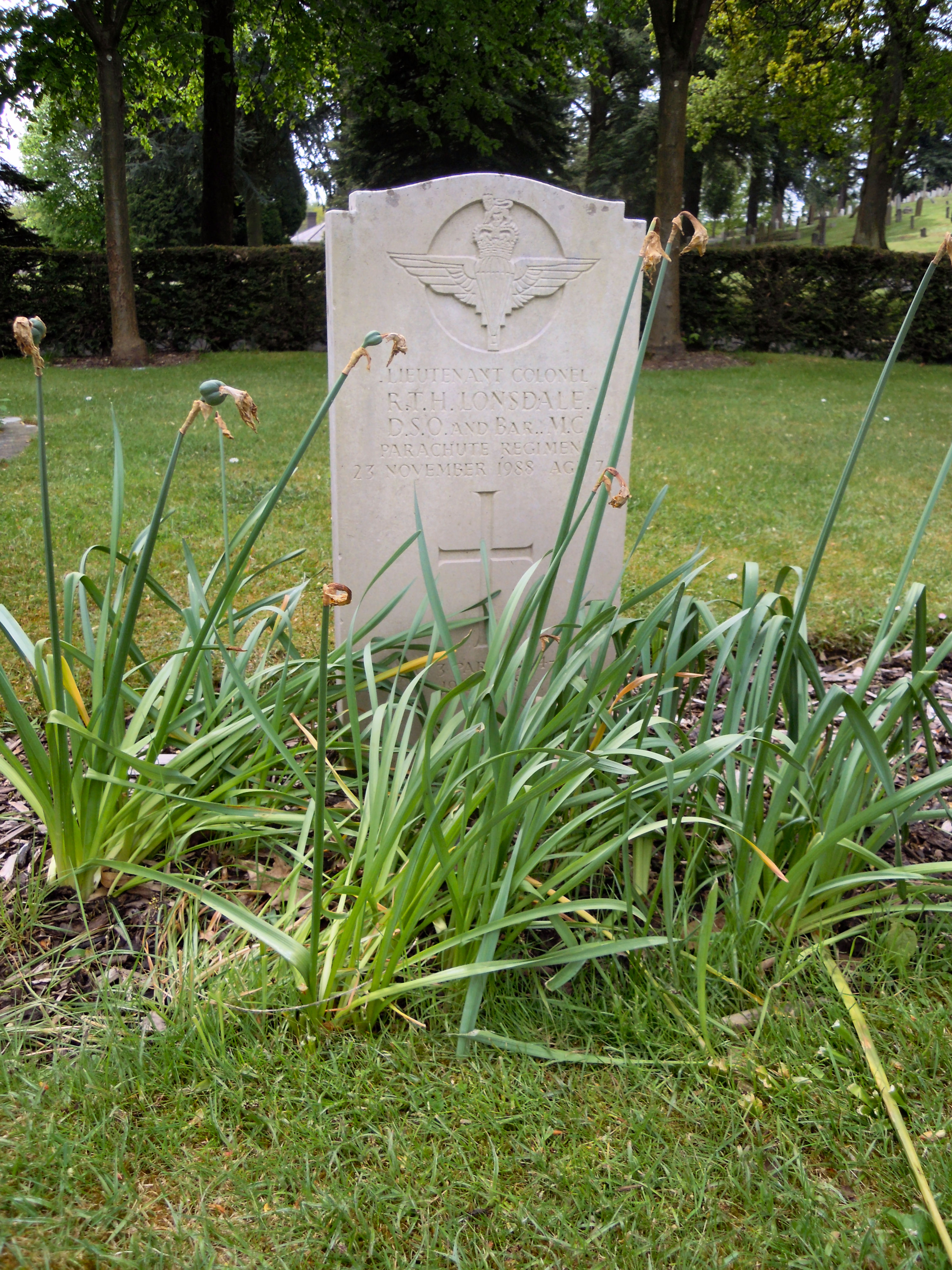
Lonsdales's grave in Aldershot Military Cemetery.

Lonsdale later commanded an amalgamated force of the 3rd and 11th Parachute battalions and saw service in Palestine, being promoted to lieutenant colonel. In 1946 he transferred from the Parachute Regiment and served with the King's African Rifles for a time in Uganda, and then left the British Army.

He remained in Africa for several years, entering the wine trade, and then returned to the United Kingdom living in Jersey, the Isle of Man and Bath, Somerset. He died on 23 November 1988, just a few weeks away from his 75th birthday. He is buried in Aldershot Military Cemetery.

== Bibliography ==
- Frost, Major General John (1980). A Drop Too Many. Cassell. ISBN 0-85052-927-1.
- Harclerode, Peter (2005). Wings Of War – Airborne Warfare 1918 – 1945. Weidenfeld & Nicolson. ISBN 0-304-36730-3.
- Middlebrook, Martin (1994). Arnhem 1944: The Airborne Battle. Viking. ISBN 0-670-83546-3.
- Ryan, Cornelius (1999) [1974]. A Bridge Too Far. Wordsworth Editions Ltd. ISBN 1-84022-213-1.
- Saunders, Hilary St. George (1972). The Red Beret – The Story Of The Parachute Regiment 1940 – 1945. White Lion Publishers Ltd. ISBN 0-85617-823-3.
- Thompson, Major-General Julian (1990). Ready for Anything: The Parachute Regiment at War. Fontana. ISBN 0-00-637505-7.
- Waddy, John (1999). A Tour of the Arnhem Battlefields. Pen & Sword Books Limited. ISBN 0-85052-571-3.
