= Historisch museum APZ Wolfheze =

Museum in Wolfheze, Netherlands

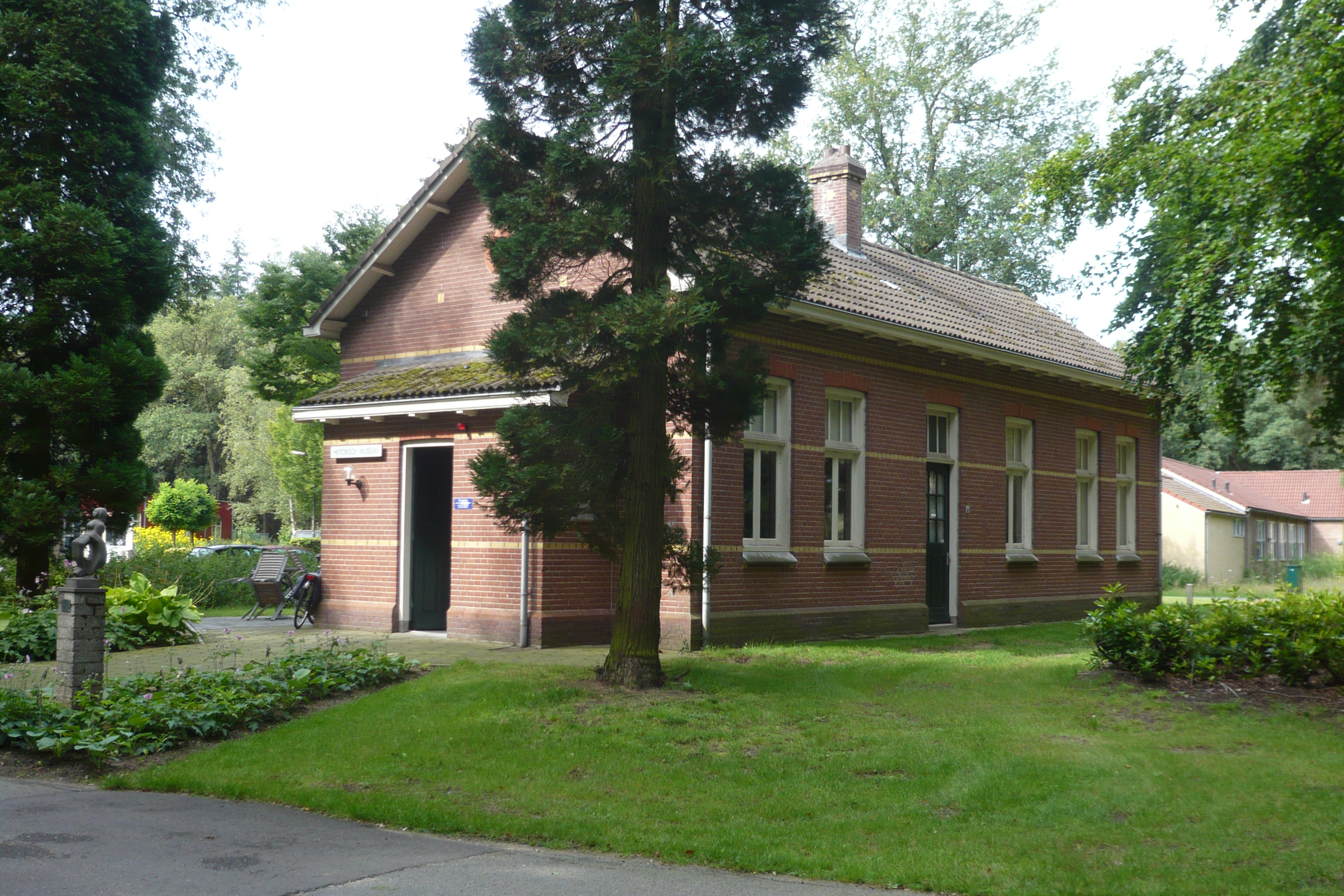
Historisch museum APZ Wolfheze

The Historisch museum APZ Wolfheze is a museum located in Wolfheze in a former therapy building of the General Psychiatric Hospital ("Algemeen Psychiatrisch Ziekenhuis"), which was founded in 1907 and still exists there as part of the regional GGZ facility "Pro Persona".

== History ==
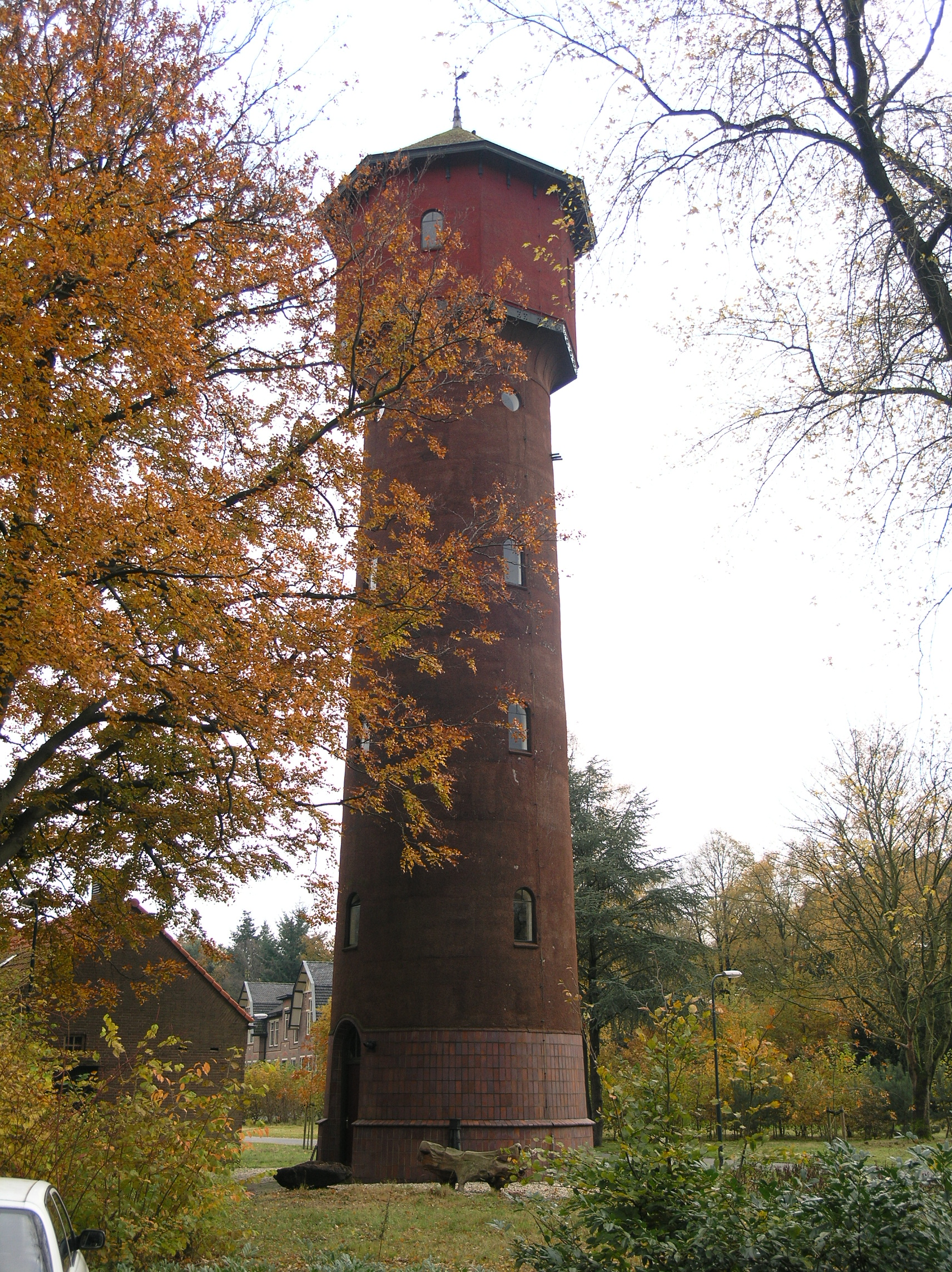
Water tower of the old hospital, today a county heritage site.

The museum was opened in order to preserve the highlights of the former psychiatric hospital artifacts, which went through many changes since the original hospital opened in 1907. The museum was restored and is kept open by a large group of enthusiastic volunteers who actively work on the collection of former patient belongings, medical equipment, and musical instruments. Several leading Dutch writers in the psychiatric profession once worked at the hospital, including Dr. H. van der Drift, known for his work on physical therapy and the use of music and games in group therapy. Besides items from the hospital, the museum also houses some World War II artifacts from Operation Market Garden.

The museum is open Wednesdays from 10:00 to 16:00. Admission is free. The museum houses an archive and works together with the cultural heritage association of Gelderland. Parking is available in front of the museum on the street. The museum can be contacted for small groups.
