= 156th Parachute Battalion (United Kingdom) =

British airborne unit

151st Parachute Battalion 156 Parachute Battalion
- Cap badge of the Parachute Regiment.
- Active: 1941–1944
- Country: United Kingdom
- Branch: British Army
- Type: Infantry
- Role: Airborne
- Size: Battalion
- Part of: 50th Indian Parachute Brigade; 4th Parachute Brigade
- Nickname: Red Devils

Commanders
- Notable commanders: M. C. R. Hose; Sir Richard de B. Des Voeux

Insignia
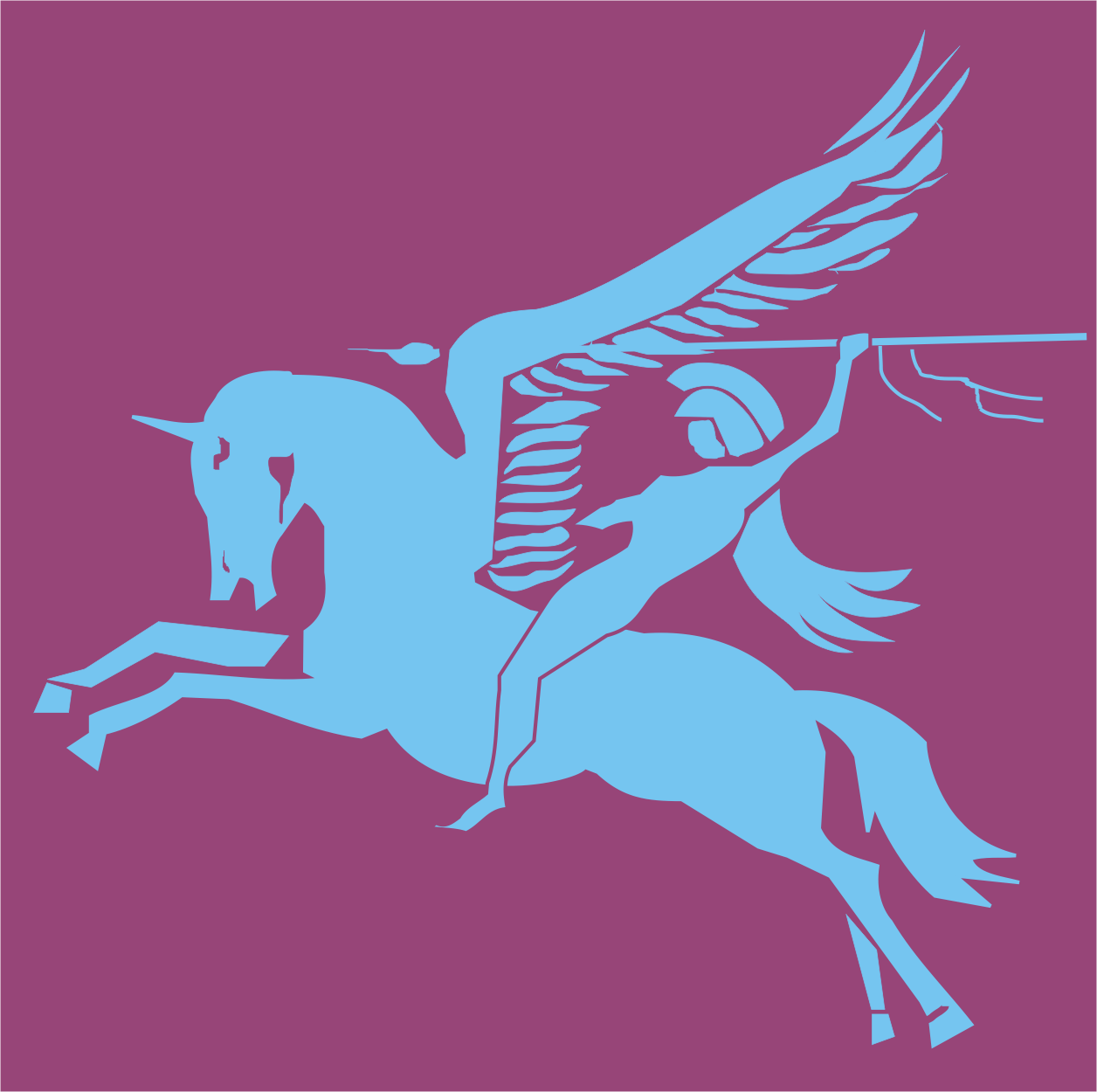
- The emblem of the Second World War British Airborne Forces, Bellerophon riding the flying horse Pegasus

The 156 Parachute Battalion was a battalion of the Parachute Regiment raised by the British Army during the Second World War.

The battalion was formed in 1941 from volunteers serving in India initially numbered the 151st Parachute Battalion and assigned to the 50th Indian Parachute Brigade. It was then decided they were no longer required in India, so the battalion was renumbered the 156 Parachute Battalion and moved to the Middle East to join the 4th Parachute Brigade, 1st Airborne Division.

The battalion fought briefly in the Allied invasion of Italy in September 1943 and a year later in the Battle of Arnhem, part of Operation Market Garden, where heavy casualties resulted in the disbanding of the battalion, the few surviving men being distributed amongst the battalions of the 1st Parachute Brigade.

== Formation ==
Impressed by the success of German airborne operations, during the Battle of France, the British Prime Minister, Winston Churchill, directed the War Office to investigate the possibility of creating a corps of 5,000 parachute troops. On 22 June 1940, No. 2 Commando was turned over to parachute duties and on 21 November, re-designated the 11th Special Air Service Battalion, with a parachute and glider wing.

The battalion was raised in October 1941 from volunteers from all of the 27 British infantry battalions in British India and originally numbered the 151st Parachute Battalion, part of the 50th Indian Parachute Brigade. However it was decided in October 1942, that the brigade would only have Indian or Gurkha battalions and the 151st was released and sent to the Middle East. The battalion was redesignated 156th Parachute Battalion for no other reason than to confuse German intelligence.

Arriving in the Middle East, the battalion together with the 10th and the 11th parachute battalions formed the 4th Parachute Brigade, 1st Airborne Division.

In 1942 a parachute battalion had an establishment of 556 men in three companies (three platoons each) supported by a 3 inch mortar and a Vickers machine gun platoon. By 1944 a support company to command the battalions heavy weapons was added. It comprised three platoons: Mortar Platoon with eight 3-inch (76 mm) mortars, Machine Gun Platoon with four Vickers machine guns and an Anti-tank Platoon with ten PIAT anti-tank projectors.

== Operations ==
The 156 Parachute Battalion's first combat experience was during Operation Slapstick in Italy. The operation was carried out by the 1st Airborne Divisions, 2nd and 4th Parachute Brigades. The battalion sailed from Bizerta on 8 September 1943. The landings at Taranto were unopposed, the Italians surrendering the night before. The 156 Battalion and the 10th Parachute Battalion together captured the town and airfield of Gioia, and in November 1943 the battalion was withdrawn to England.

=== Arnhem ===
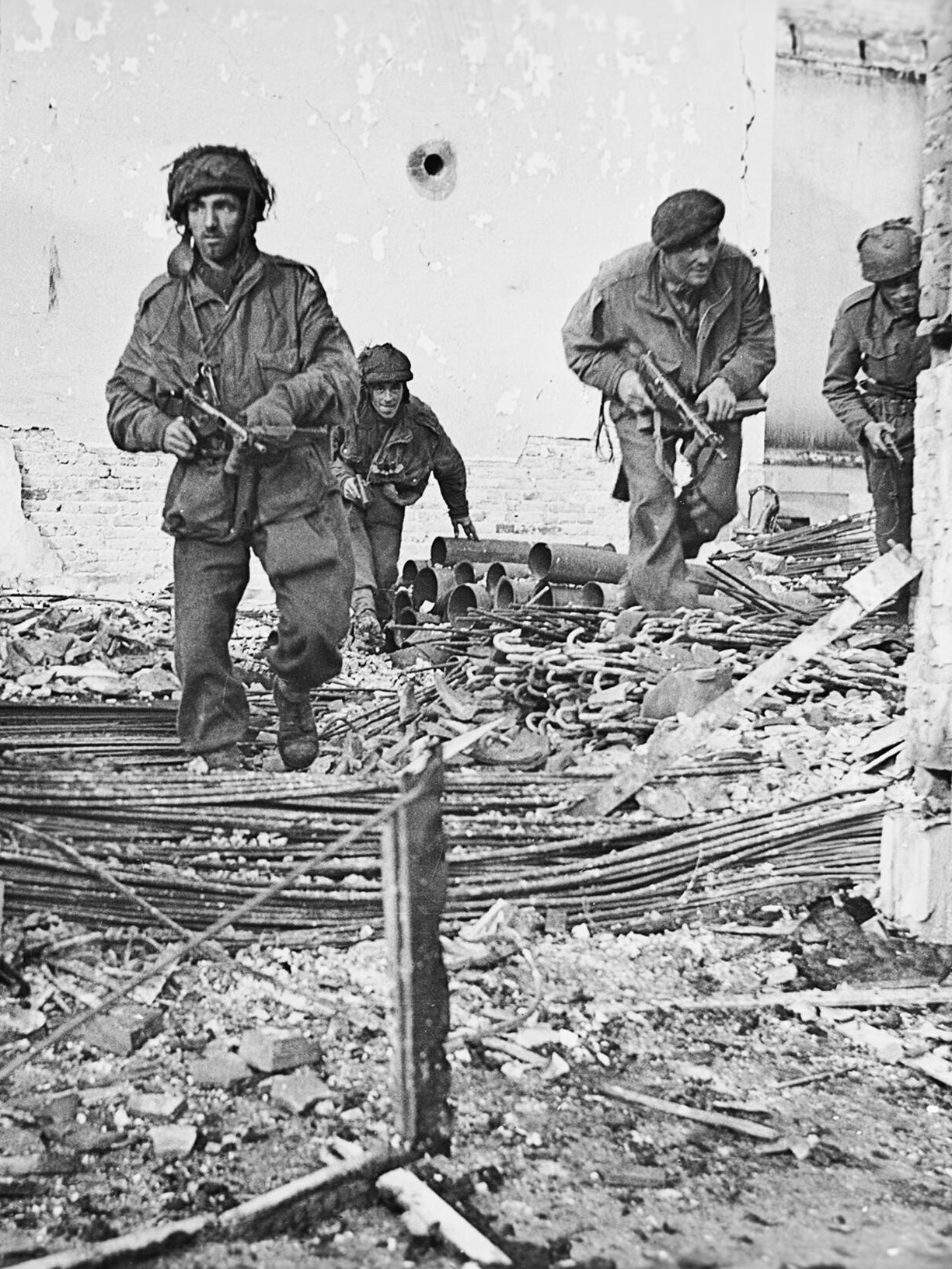
Four men of the 156 Parachute Battalion moving through a shell-damaged house in Oosterbeek September 1944.

The 156 Parachute Battalion and the rest of the 4th Parachute Brigade landed to the west of Arnhem on the second day of the battle 18 September 1944. Their objective was to hold a position on the high ground north of Arnhem at Koepel. With the 156 Parachute Battalion leading on the right followed by the 10th Battalion on the left. By dawn the following day the battalion was just north of the Utrecht to Arnhem railway line. When they came under attack from German 88 mm guns. Both battalions were ordered to start an assault on the position at 07:00. After repeated attacks the battalion got no further forward. The defenders from the 9th SS Panzer Division had been here for two days and were well dug in. The German position included infantry, self propelled guns and armoured cars. The battalion fought all day in the woods but its losses were very heavy, with 'A' Company losing all of its officers. Finally brigade headquarters obtained permission to withdraw south of the rail line into Oosterbeek. The battalion started to pull back over the rail line but in the confusion of the withdrawal no orders had been given about where they were to go once south of the rail line. Most of 'B' and 'Support' Companies headed towards Wolfheze while the rest of the battalion headed towards Oosterbeek, the two parts of the battalion were never reunited. The units in Wolfheze and the remnants of the 10th Parachute Battalion now prepared to defend the village.

Casualties had continued to mount including the commanding officer Lieutenant-Colonel Richard des Voeux and the second in command who were both killed on 20 September. The battalion was now under command of Major Geoffrey Powell The German tactics were to bombard the British positions with tank and mortar fire. The remnants of the battalion were withdrawn into the perimeter formed by the division around Oosterbeek. By 21 September pressure from the German attacks had squeezed the perimeter to less than 1,000 yards (910 m) across.

On 22 September the bulk of the 1st Polish Parachute Brigade were dropped south of the river. This drew off some of the Germans from around the divisional perimeter to confront the new threat. The defenders now had to cope with over 100 German artillery guns firing onto their positions. By 23 September the battalions position was subjected to constant mortar and artillery fire and incursions by tanks and infantry were becoming more and more frequent. Casualties forced a contraction of the perimeter but first the Germans had to be evicted from the houses behind them which they were to occupy.

On 24 September the decision was made by Lieutenant General Horrocks commander XXX Corps to withdraw what was left of the division south of the Rhine. The remnants of the battalion were evacuated over the night of 25/26 September. During the battle of Arnhem the battalion's casualties were, 98 dead, 68 were evacuated and 313 became prisoners of war. The casualties sustained were never replaced and the battalion was disbanded after the battle.
