= 11th Parachute Battalion (United Kingdom) =

- Cap badge of the Parachute Regiment.
- Country: United Kingdom
- Branch: British Army
- Type: Infantry
- Role: Airborne forces
- Size: Battalion
- Part of: 4th Parachute Brigade
- Nickname: Red Devils
- Mottos: Utrinque Paratus (Latin for "Ready for Anything")
- Engagements: Battle of Kos; Battle of Arnhem

Commanders
- Notable commanders: Sir George Lea; Richard Lonsdale

Insignia
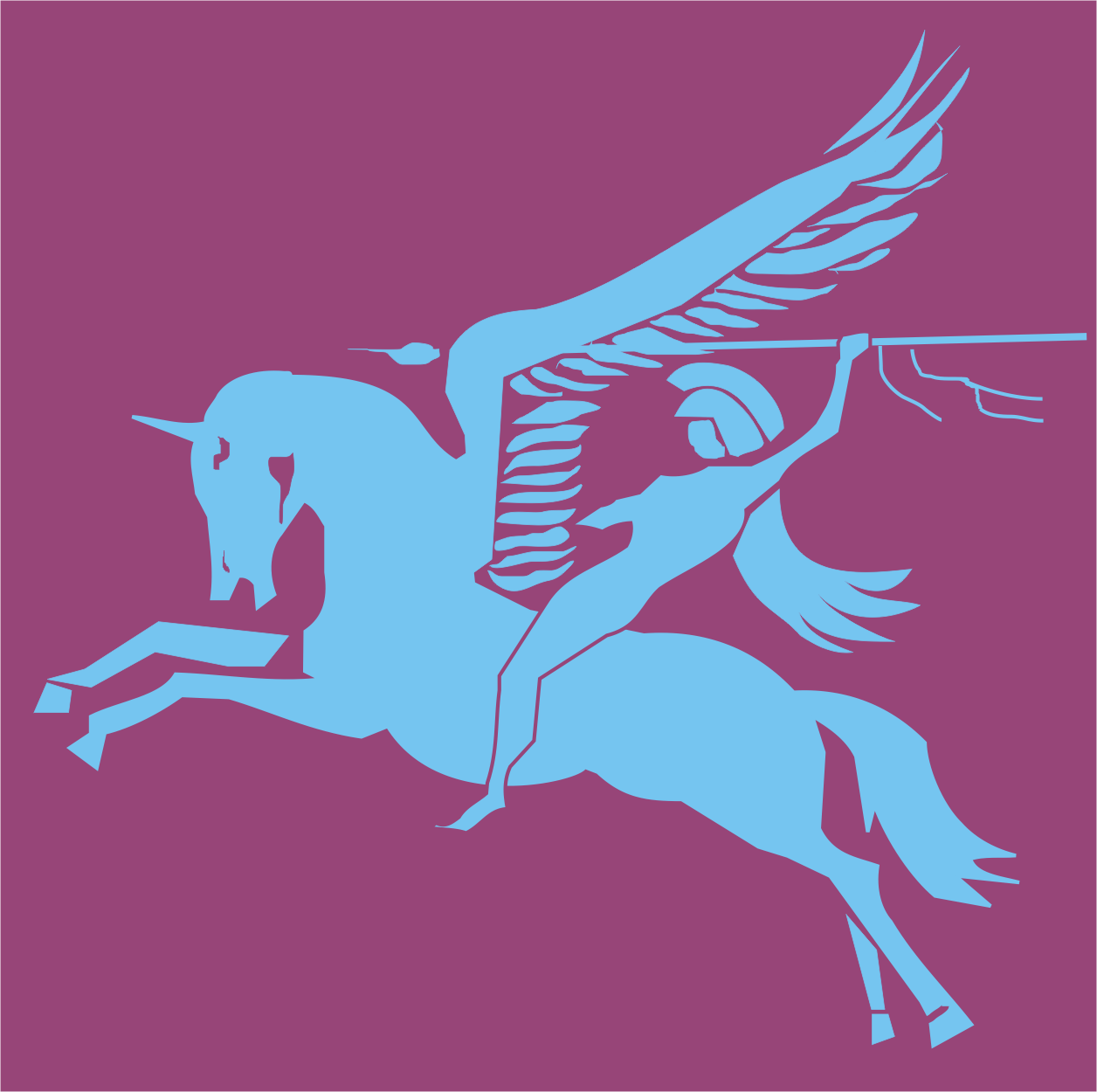
- The emblem of the Second World War British Airborne Forces, Bellerophon riding the flying horse Pegasus

The 11th Parachute Battalion was an airborne infantry battalion of the Parachute Regiment, raised by the British Army in World War II.

The battalion was formed in the Middle East and was assigned to the 4th Parachute Brigade, 1st Airborne Division. As it was still training it was left behind when the rest of the brigade took part in the invasion of Italy. One company later parachuted onto the island of Kos taking prisoner the large Italian garrison. The battalion rejoined the rest of the 1st Airborne Division, then in England. The only battle in which the battalion participated was the Battle of Arnhem, part of Operation Market Garden, in September 1944. The battalion sustained very heavy casualties and was disbanded following the battle and the men were used as replacements elsewhere.

After the Second World War a reserve 11th Battalion was formed by the Territorial Army (TA) in 1947, but it was disbanded nine years later.

== Formation ==
Impressed by the success of German airborne operations, during the Battle of France, the British Prime Minister, Winston Churchill, directed the War Office to investigate the possibility of creating a corps of 5,000 parachute troops. On 22 June 1940, No. 2 Commando was turned over to parachute duties and on 21 November, re-designated the 11th Special Air Service Battalion, with a parachute and glider wing, and later became the 1st Parachute Battalion. It was these men who took part in the first British airborne operation, Operation Colossus, on 10 February 1941. The success of the raid prompted the War Office to expand the existing airborne force, setting up the Airborne Forces Depot and Battle School in Derbyshire in April 1942, and creating the Parachute Regiment as well as converting a number of infantry battalions into airborne battalions in August 1942.

The 11th Parachute Battalion was raised in Kibrit Egypt in March 1943. Assigned to the 4th Parachute Brigade, 1st Airborne Division the battalion was still in training when the rest of the brigade left to join the division for the Allied invasion of Italy.

In 1942 a parachute battalion had an establishment of 556 men in three companies (three platoons each) supported by a 3-inch (76 mm) mortar and a Vickers machine gun platoon. By 1944 a support company to command the battalions heavy weapons was added. It comprised three platoons: Mortar Platoon with eight 3-inch (76 mm) mortars, Machine Gun Platoon with four Vickers machine guns and an Anti-tank Platoon with ten PIAT anti-tank projectors.

The only combat seen by the battalion in the Mediterranean, was in September 1943. 'A' Company and the mortar and machine gun platoons parachuted onto the island of Kos in the Dodecanese and captured the airfield. The Italian garrison numbered around 4,000 men did not put up any resistance. The company was withdrawn soon after and rejoined the battalion. In December 1943 the battalion rejoined the 4th Parachute Brigade who by this time were in England.

== Arnhem ==
When the battalion landed outside Arnhem on 18 September they were detached from the brigade and sent to reinforce the 1st Parachute Battalion and the glider-borne infantry of 2nd South Staffords, trying to fight through to the 2nd Parachute Battalion which had captured the northern end of the Arnhem road bridge. The two battalions were located in the town about 1,100 yards (1,000 m) short of the bridge. They were just about to start another attempt to break through to the 2nd Parachute Battalion. With no appreciation of the ground the 11th Battalion was held in reserve playing no part in the attack. Under heavy fire the attempt stalled and to relieve the pressure on the assaulting troops, the 11th Battalion was asked to carry out a left flanking attack on the German positions. Orders were being issued for the assault, when the divisional commander Major-General Roy Urquhart personally intervened, forbidding the battalion to take part in what he now considered a futile attack. The 2nd South Staffords had been decimated with only their 'C' Company surviving as a unit. The 1st Parachute Battalion were in an even worse state and only numbered about 40 men.

The battalion was gradually worn down withdrawing through the city and casualties mounted. A move to gain some high ground to the north was discovered and the battalion was caught in the open and decimated, with only around 150 men left. One of the casualties being the commanding officer Lieutenant Colonel George Lea. The second in command Major Richard Lonsdale now took command of the battalion and the remnants of the 1st, 3rd Parachute and 2nd South Staffords battalions. Forming them into an ad hoc force which became known as Lonsdale Force. They were withdrawn to Oosterbeek where the division was forming a defensive perimeter, digging in on the south eastern side with their right flank on the river. Lonsdale addressed the men before the Germans arrived;

You know as well as I do there are a lot of bloody Germans coming at us. Well, all we can do is to stay here and hang on in the hope that somebody catches us up. We must fight for our lives and stick together. We've fought the Germans before — in North Africa, Sicily, Italy. They weren't good enough for us then, and they're bloody well not good enough for us now. They're up against the finest soldiers in the world. An hour from now you will take up defensive positions north of the road outside. Make certain you dig in well and that your weapons and ammo are in good order. We are getting short of ammo, so when you shoot you shoot to kill. Good luck to you all.

The defenders were involved in a number of desperate actions, and hand-to-hand fighting keeping the Germans out of the divisions perimeter. One of the men Lance-Sergeant John Baskeyfield of the South Staffords anti-tank platoon, was awarded a posthumous Victoria Cross. By 21 September pressure from the German attacks had squeezed the perimeter to less than 1,000 yards (910 m) across.

On 22 September the bulk of the 1st Polish Parachute Brigade were dropped south of the river. This drew off some of the Germans from around the divisional perimeter to confront the new threat. The defenders now had to cope with over 100 German artillery guns firing onto their positions.

On 24 September the decision was made by Lieutenant-General Horrocks commander XXX Corps to withdraw what was left of the division south of the Rhine. On the morning of 25 September units of the 9th SS Panzer Division attacked the battalion in force, attempting to cut the division off from the river. The initial attack was stopped by bayonets and hand grenades. Following attacks were driven off by direct fire from the guns of the 1st Airlanding Light Regiment, Royal Artillery and the 64th Medium regiment, XXX Corps dropping their shells on the battalions positions. The remnants of the battalion were evacuated with help from the 43rd (Wessex) Reconnaissance Regiment on the night of 25/26 September. The casualties sustained by the battalion were never replaced and it was disbanded after the battle of Arnhem and the men sent to the 1st Parachute Brigade.

== Territorial Army ==
When the Territorial Army was reformed following the war in 1947, a new 11th Battalion was raised. It was formed by the conversion of the 8th Battalion, Middlesex Regiment, and had Euston Baker as its honorary colonel. It was part of the reserve 16th Airborne Division. Following defence cuts if reverted to being the 8th Battalion, Middlesex Regiment in August 1956.
