= Wolfheze =

- Village
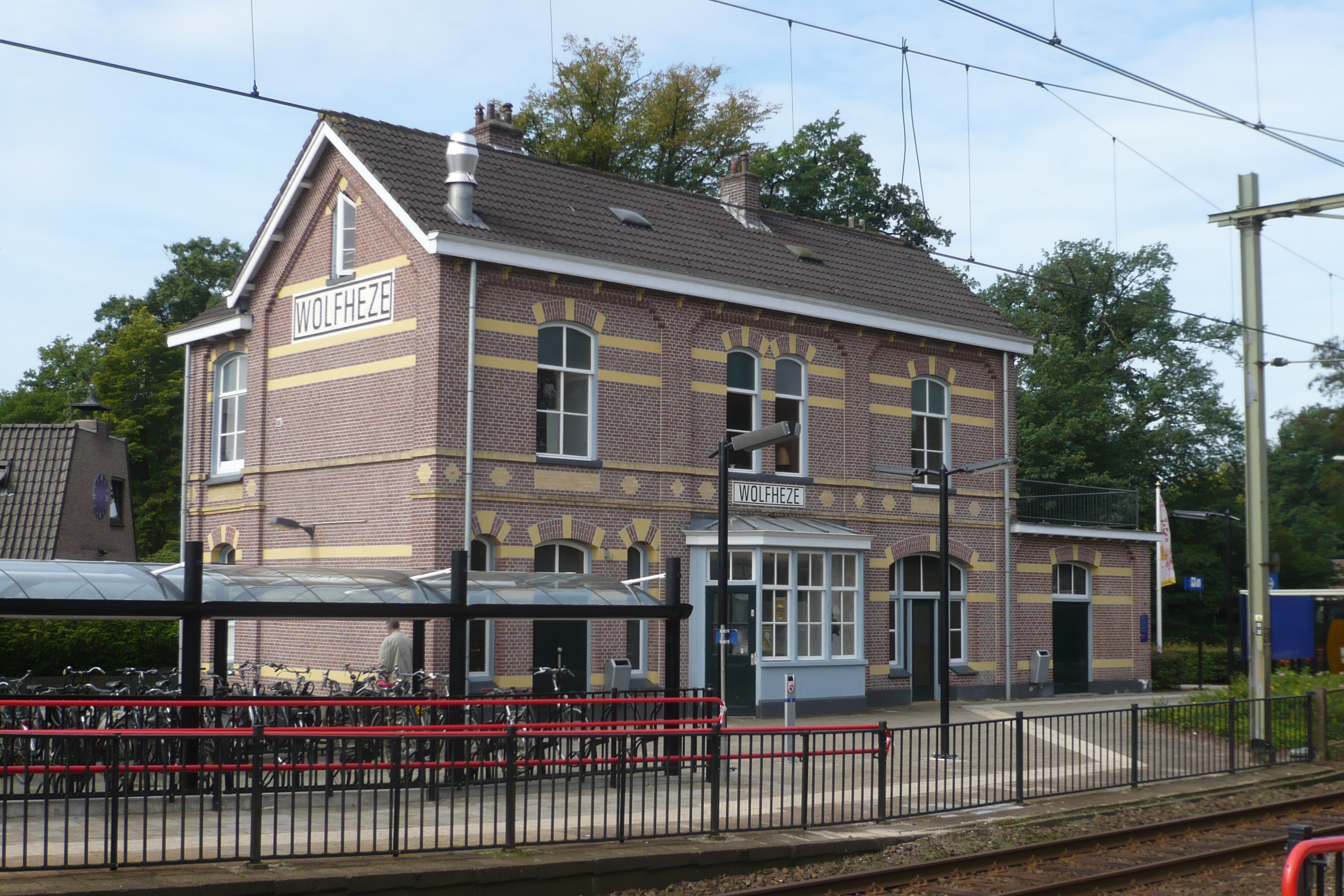
- Train Station Wolfheze on the Utrecht-Arnhem line

- Location in the province of Gelderland in the Netherlands Wolfheze (Netherlands)
- Coordinates: 52°0′18″N 5°47′30″E
- Country: Netherlands
- Province: Gelderland
- Municipality: Renkum

Area
  - Total: 11.28 km^{2} (4.36 sq mi)
- Elevation: 25 m (82 ft)

Population (2021)
  - Total: 1,740
  - Density: 154/km^{2} (400/sq mi)
- Time zone: UTC+1 (CET)
  - Summer (DST): UTC+2 (CEST)
- Postal code: 6874
- Dialing code: 026
- Website: www.renkum.nl

Wolfheze (Dutch pronunciation: [ˈʋɔl(ə)fheːzə]) is a village in the Dutch province of Gelderland. It is located in the municipality of Renkum, 10 km northwest of the city of Arnhem.

== History ==
=== Stone Age-Middle Ages ===
Wolfheze, literally meaning 'the young forest where wolves live', started as a living area at the slopes of the natural streams which still run the little valley. From very early days burial mounds (1500 B.C.) can be found, one of these known as the 'Kings grave', for the remains found in it. In the 10th or 11th century a stone church, approx. 8 meters wide and about 20 meters long, was built on what is today still called the 'Capellenheuvel' (chapels hill) A few farms (all disappeared), ground walls against game and crop fields built the former hamlet of 'Wolffheezen'. It must have been abandoned at the end of the 16th century. The last of the church remains were sold as building material as an historic source says in the year of 1624. The hamlet was not on this location by accident; routes for heavy traffic from Germany to the Netherlands went right through, as still can be seen by the deep trails in the heath.

In the 19th century the remains of the church were recovered. Most of the burial mounts were excavated as well. Nowadays, the site still shows the remains of where the church was, the burial mounts, the tracks of the German traffic and the remains of at least 13 crop fields from the Middle Ages.

=== 1900-Present ===
Wolfheze has had a train station on the railway line between Utrecht and Arnhem since 1845. In 1906 a charitable institution for the care of the mentally ill (Dutch: Vereniging tot Christelijke verzorging van geestes- en zenuwzieken) purchased a large woods on the south side of the train line on which to build a care center. In 1911 a center for the blind purchased a tract of land on the north side. During the First World War German prisoners of war were camped nearby. The street name 'Duitsekampweg' (German camp road) is a reminder of this site, where 26 years later one of the landing zones of the British army was. Renkum nowadays has about 1500 inhabitants.

== Mental health facility ==
The Western part of the village is still a revalidation centre for the mentally ill, called Pro Persona today. The center has a small museum with historical artifacts illustrating the history of the care for the mentally ill in Wolfheze. The centre was bombed by mistake in World War II and the hospital needed to be evacuated, an operation that resulted in several deaths among the weaker patients.

== Operation Market Garden ==
Wolfheze is also one of the many places where fighting in World War II took place, and an Airborne monument is situated there to commemorate Polish and British participants in Operation Market Garden. Wolfheze was one of the landing grounds where gliders dropped paratroopers as part of Operation Market Garden (see above), a plan to liberate Arnhem. The Allies suspected German troops in a psychiatric hospital in the town, and chose to bomb it.

== Gallery ==
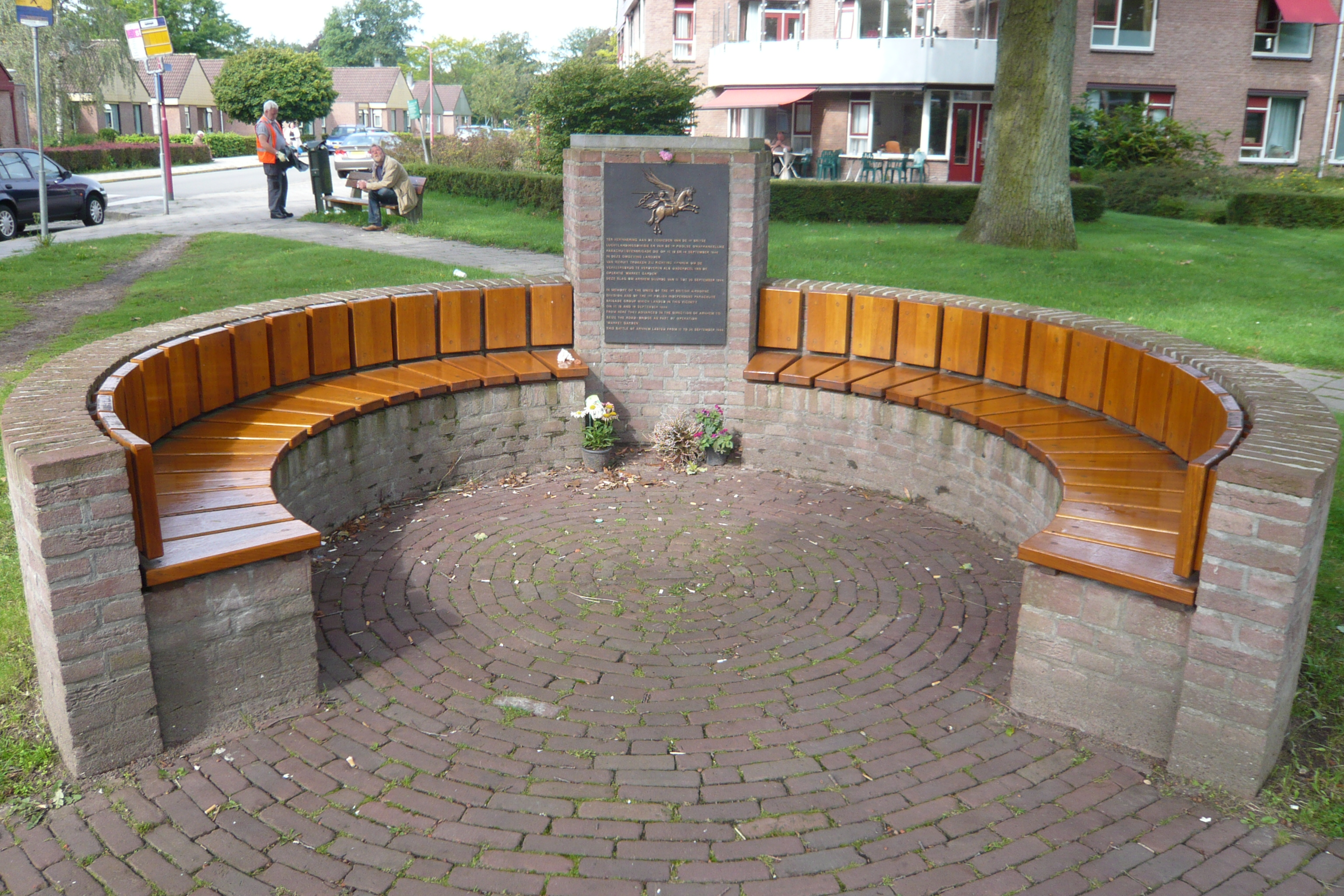
Airborne monument to commemorate the Polish brigade who joined the British for Market Garden.

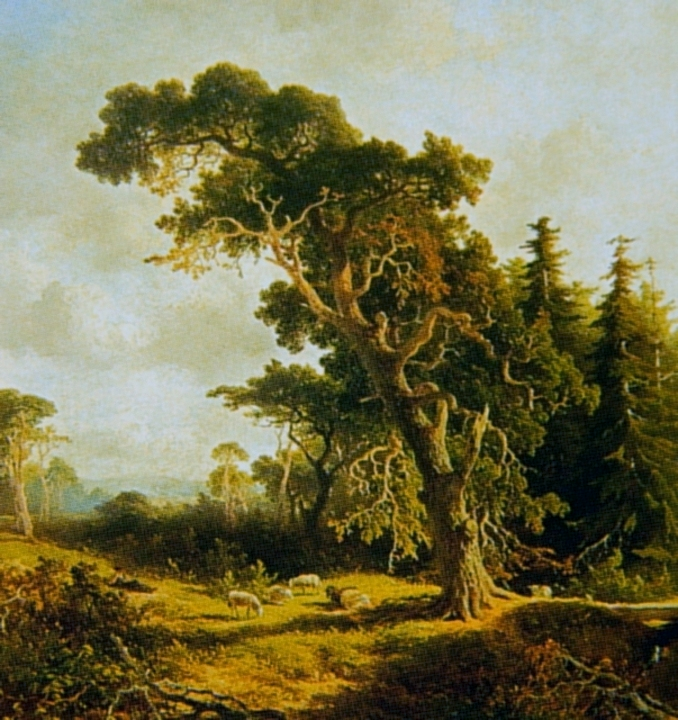
Painting of the 1,000 year old tree (c. 1850). The tree fell down in 2006.

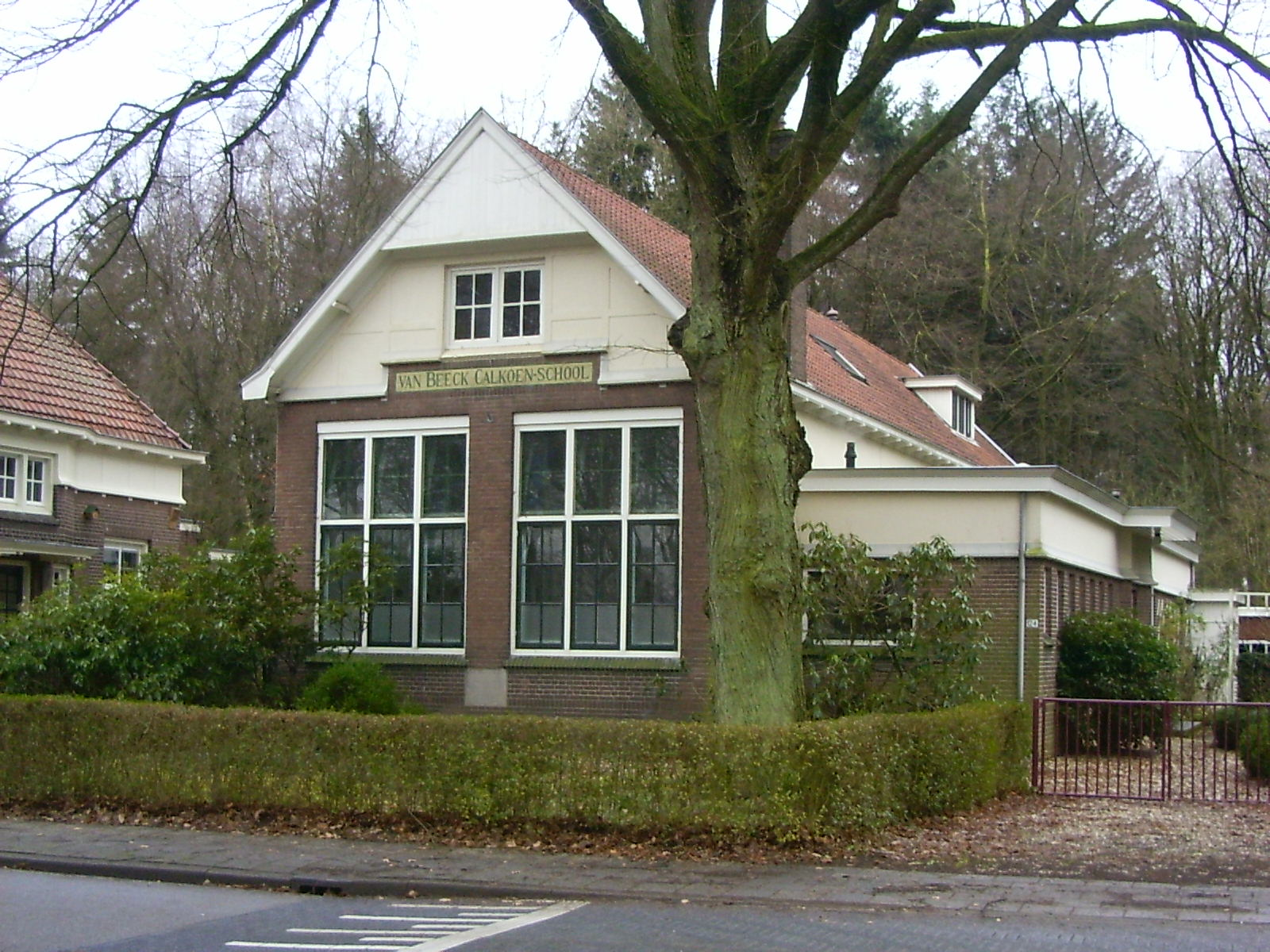
School in Wolfheze

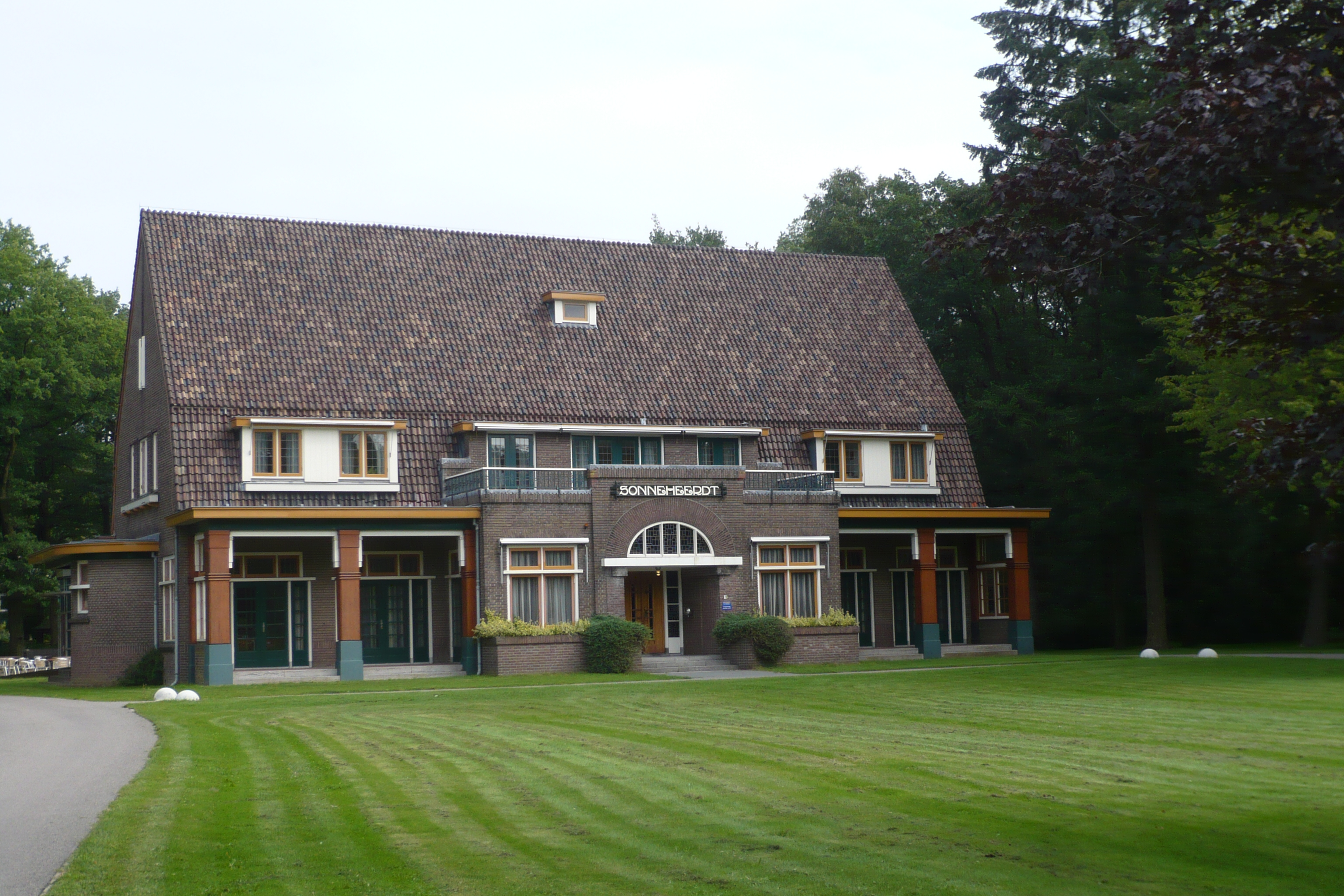
Sanatorium Sonneherdt
