= Robert Henry Cain =

British Army officer (1909–1974)

Major Robert Henry Cain VC TD
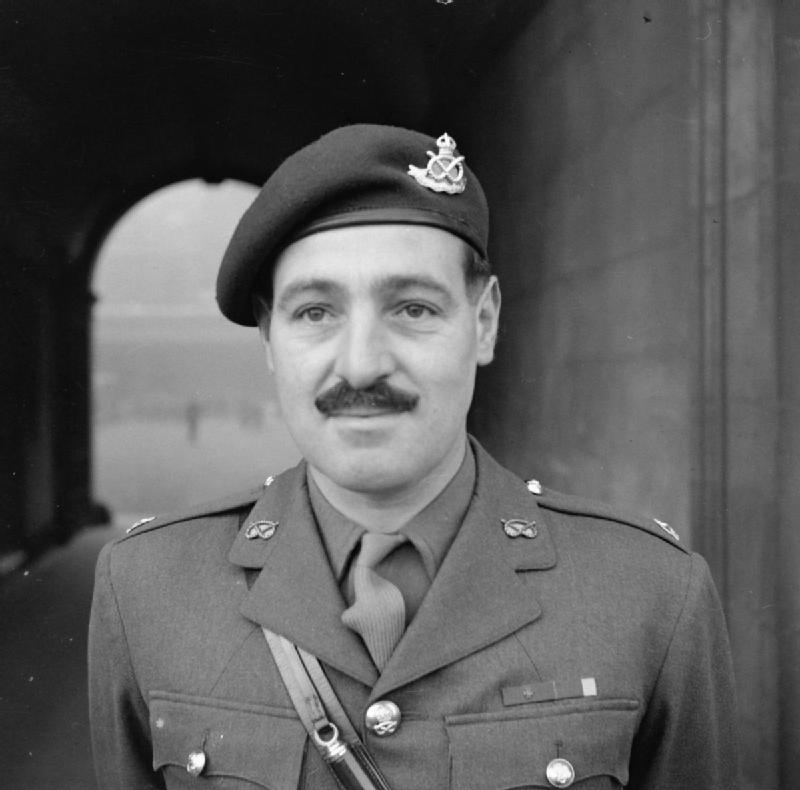
- Robert Henry Cain at his VC investiture (1944)
- Born: 2 January 1909; Shanghai, China
- Died: 2 May 1974 (aged 65); Crowborough, Sussex
- Burial place: Braddan Cemetery, Isle of Man
- Relatives: Finlo Cain (son); Rosemary Diplock (daughter); Helena Cain (daughter); Frances Cain (daughter)
- Military career
- Allegiance: United Kingdom
- Branch: British Army
- Service years: 1928–1945
- Rank: Major
- Service number: 129484
- Units: Royal Northumberland Fusiliers attached South Staffordshire Regiment
- Conflicts: Second World War: Operation Husky; Battle of Arnhem; Operation Doomsday
- Awards: Victoria Cross
- Other work: Worked for Royal Dutch Shell

Major Robert Henry Cain VC TD (2 January 1909 – 2 May 1974) was a British Army officer who was a recipient of the Victoria Cross, the highest award for gallantry in the face of the enemy that can be awarded to British and Commonwealth forces.

Cain grew up on the Isle of Man and joined the Honourable Artillery Company in 1928. After working overseas he was granted an emergency commission into the Army in 1940. He transferred to the South Staffordshire Regiment in 1942, and joined their 2nd Battalion, part of the British 1st Airborne Division. He saw active service during the Allied Invasion of Sicily in 1943 and again during the Battle of Arnhem the following year. During the battle Major Cain's company was closely engaged with enemy tanks, self-propelled guns and infantry. Cain continually exposed himself to danger while leading his men and personally dispatched as much enemy armour as possible. Despite sustaining several injuries he refused medical attention and for his gallantry he was awarded the Victoria Cross.

Later in the war he took part in Operation Doomsday, where the 1st Airborne Division oversaw the German surrender in Norway. He left the army in late 1945 and returned to his pre-war job at Royal Dutch Shell. He died of cancer in 1974.

== Early life ==
Robert Henry Cain was born in Shanghai on 2 January 1909. His parents were Manx, and returned to the Isle of Man when he was young. He was educated at King William's College. In 1928, Cain joined the Honourable Artillery Company, a unit of the Territorial Army (TA). The TA was the volunteer reserve force of the British Army and members continued in civilian employment. Cain worked in Thailand and Malaya for Shell. He was placed on the supplementary reserve list on 12 February 1931.

== Second World War ==
In April 1940, shortly after the start of the Second World War, Cain was granted an emergency commission into the Royal Northumberland Fusiliers as a second lieutenant. In 1942, he was seconded to the 2nd Battalion South Staffordshire Regiment before being temporarily promoted to the rank of major in April 1943—a position he retained until the rank was formally confirmed in 1945. The 2nd South Staffordshire was part of 1st Airlanding Brigade, which landed in Sicily in July 1943 as part of Operation Ladbroke. In the same month, Cain took command of the battalion's B company.

=== Battle of Arnhem ===
The Battle of Arnhem was part of Operation Market Garden, a coordinated attempt to secure a string of strategic bridges through the Netherlands. At Arnhem, the British 1st Airborne Division and Polish 1st Independent Parachute Brigade were tasked with securing the bridges over the Lower Rhine, which were the final objectives of the operation. However, the airborne forces that dropped on 17 September had no knowledge that the 9th and 10th SS Panzer Divisions were positioned near Arnhem. Their presence added a substantial number of Panzergrenadiers, tanks and self-propelled guns to the German defences, and the Allies suffered heavily in the ensuing battle. Only a small force briefly held one end of the Arnhem road bridge before being overrun on the 21st. The rest of the division became trapped in a small pocket west of the bridge and had to be evacuated on the 25th. The Allies failed to cross the Rhine, which remained under German control until Allied offensives in March 1945.

==== Advance into Arnhem ====
The Allies planned to fly British and Polish to Arnhem in three separate lifts over three days. Major General Roy Urquhart decided to deploy the 1st Airlanding Brigade first, as glider troops could assemble more quickly than parachute infantry, and secure the landing areas. Cain took off with the first lift along with two companies of the South Staffords, but only five minutes after departing from RAF Manston, the tow rope connecting the Albemarle tug to his Horsa glider pulled out of the leading aircraft. After landing safely, the glider's occupants were able to fly out the following day with the second lift.

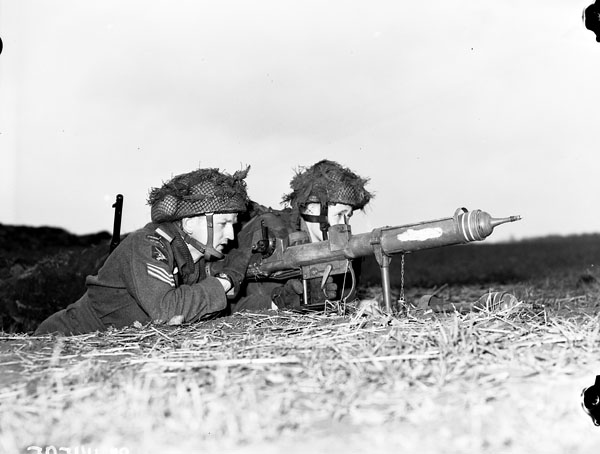
Two Airborne soldiers demonstrate a P.I.A.T. antitank weapon.

In Arnhem, the Allied plan quickly unravelled. Only a small group of the 1st Parachute Brigade, mainly elements of Lieutenant Colonel John Frost's 2nd Battalion, were able to reach the bridge. The 1st and 3rd Battalions were unable to penetrate the outer suburbs of the city, and their advance stalled, so in order to support them, the first lift of the South Staffords were sent forward on the morning of the 18th. When Cain arrived with the second lift, they too were sent forward, arriving at the outskirts of Arnhem on the night of the 18th. Lieutenant Colonel David Dobie of the 1st Battalion proposed a concentrated attack on a narrow front between the Lower Rhine and the Arnhem railway line. The South Staffords would advance toward the bridge, with the remnants of the 1st and 3rd Battalions on their right flank, while the 11th Parachute Battalion remained in reserve. The Staffords moved forward at 4.30am with D Company in the lead, followed by B and A Companies with C Company in reserve. In the area around St Elizabeth Hospital, the lead company met heavy resistance clearing houses. B Company then took the lead, getting as far as a dell near the Arnhem City Museum. Here, Cain and his men encountered enemy armour for the first time. The company was poorly equipped, relying solely on P.I.A.T.s and mortars. Despite their limited resources, Cain and several members of his company took up positions and opened fire on the advancing armoured vehicles. However, their efforts, though determined, were ineffective, and they were unable to inflict any significant damage or disable the enemy vehicles. By 11:30, they had run out of P.I.A.T. ammunition and the tanks now dominated the area. Their position was clearly hopeless, and so Lieutenant Colonel McCardie, the commanding officer (CO) of 2nd Battalion, The South Staffordshire Regiment, ordered them to withdraw from the dell. Cain fell back with several of his men, but few of them were able to escape, while the men of the other companies were forced to surrender. Cain was the only senior officer of the battalion to escape in what he later described as the "South Staff's Waterloo".

As the surviving men fell back through the 11th Battalion's positions, Major Gilchrist (A Company, 11th Battalion) met Cain, who told him, "The tanks are coming, give me a P.I.A.T." Gilchrist was unable to oblige, and so the Staffords regrouped behind the 11th Battalion's positions with roughly 100 surviving men forming five small platoons under Cain’s command. Lieutenant Colonel George Lea, commander of the 11th Battalion, ordered them to capture a piece of wooded high ground known as Den Brink, to cover a fresh advance, and a bayonet charge quickly cleared the enemy there. However, the thick tree roots on the hill made it impossible to dig in, and after suffering severe casualties, Cain made the decision to withdraw to Oosterbeek.

==== Oosterbeek perimeter ====
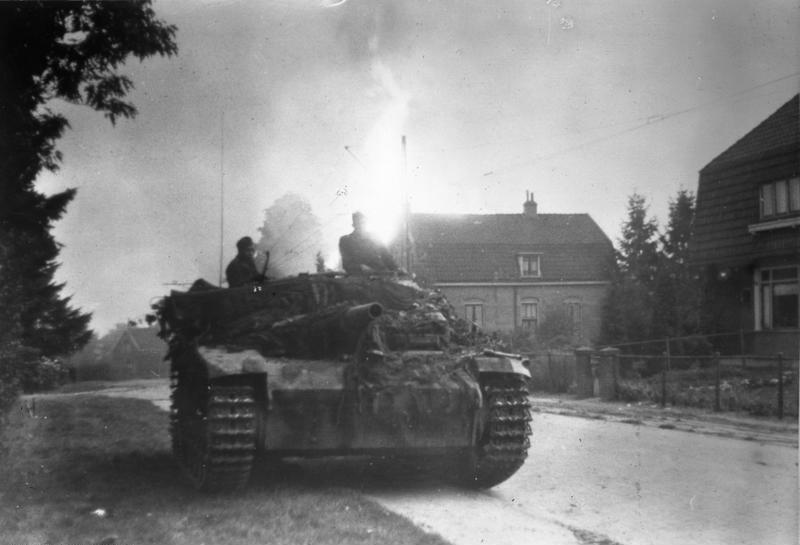
A German Sturmhaubitze 42 at Arnhem.

The remnants of the four battalions fell back in disarray to the divisional perimeter at Oosterbeek. Here, they were gathered into defensive units by Lieutenant Colonel Sheriff Thompson, CO 1st Airlanding Light Artillery Regiment, who forcibly halted many of the panicked troops. Alarmed that the many retreating units would soon leave his own 75 Millimetre Howitzers undefended, he sought out Cain, the most senior officer, and ordered him to organise the men into a defensive screen ahead of the gun positions. Thompson later sent Major Richard Lonsdale to take command of these outlying troops, and throughout Wednesday 20th, they weathered strong German attacks before falling back to the main divisional perimeter. The sector was designated 'Thompson Force', but was renamed 'Lonsdale Force' when Thompson was wounded the following day. To the north and west of Oosterbeek, other units fell back in the face of strong German resistance and over the next few days a thumb-shaped perimeter formed around the town, with the Rhine at its base.

Lonsdale Force's sector covered the southern end of the eastern perimeter, and Cain was one of three Majors defending this sector of the line. As the battle progressed he became determined to destroy as much enemy armour as possible and sited himself in a laundry's garden, much to the chagrin of the Dutch owner. Over the coming days Cain was everywhere, dealing with armour and snipers and encouraging his men. On the afternoon of Thursday 21st, two tanks approached Cain's position. Guided by a colleague in a building above him, Cain waited in a trench until the first tank—actually a StuG III self-propelled gun (SPG)—was close enough to engage. The SPG fired at the building, killing Cain's colleague and showering him with masonry, but despite this, Cain kept his position. Staff Sergeant Richard Long of the Glider Pilot Regiment remembered that through the clouds of dust, Cain fired round after round from his P.I.A.T. until the SPG was disabled, but whilst engaging the second tank a round exploded in the P.I.A.T. and Cain was thrown backwards. Cain recalled thinking he was blind and "shouting like a hooligan. I shouted to somebody to get onto the P.I.A.T. because there was another tank behind. I blubbered and yelled and used some very colourful language. They dragged me off to the aid post." The British brought forward one of the Light Regiment's 75mm Pack Howitzers which destroyed the tank.

Witnesses believed that Cain was incapacitated, but within half an hour, his sight returned. He refused morphine and against all advice returned to the front lines, deciding that he "wasn't wounded enough to stay where [he] was". On the following day his eardrums burst from the constant firing and barrage, but he was content to stuff his ears with bandages and continue fighting. On Sunday 24th, shortly after a truce to allow the evacuation of casualties, Cain was alerted to the approach of a Tiger tank. Together with a Royal Artillery gunner he raced for a 6 pounder Anti-Tank Gun, manoeuvred it into position, fired and disabled the tank. He wanted to continue using the gun, but the recoil mechanism was destroyed.

By 25 September, the area occupied by the Lonsdale Force saw heavy fighting against self-propelled guns, flamethrower tanks, and infantry. There were no P.I.A.T.s available to the force by now; instead Cain armed himself with a two-inch mortar. Mortars are muzzle-loading indirect fire weapons, but Cain was forced to fire it on an almost horizontal plane due to the enemy's proximity. His citation states that his leadership ensured that the South Staffordshire gave no ground and drove the enemy off in complete disorder. By the end of the battle, Cain had been reportedly responsible for the destruction or disabling of six tanks, four of which were Tigers, as well as a number of self-propelled guns.

That night the Division began to withdraw in Operation Berlin. Many men shaved and blackened their faces and Cain removed a week's growth of beard from his face, drying himself on his dirty, blood-soaked Denison smock. After successfully crossing the Rhine, this led Brigadier 'Pip' Hicks to comment "There's one officer, at least, who's shaved." Cain's reply was "I was well brought up, sir." Cain made sure all of his men were over the river by dawn, before he himself crossed in an old boat.

== Victoria Cross ==
A Victoria Cross

Fifty-nine decorations were published for the small group of men who successfully escaped Arnhem, and these were awarded in an investiture ceremony at Buckingham Palace on 6 December 1944. As well as being the only survivor of the battle to receive the Victoria Cross, Cain was also the first — and, to date, only — Manxman to be awarded the medal. Posthumous VCs were announced later, including one for Lance Sergeant John Baskeyfield of the 2nd South Staffordshire Battalion's anti-tank platoon. The 2nd Battalion thus became the only British battalion to receive two VCs in one engagement during the Second World War.

War Office, 2nd November, 1944.

The KING has been graciously pleased to approve awards of the VICTORIA CROSS to: —

Captain (temporary Major) Robert Henry Cain (129484), The Royal Northumberland Fusiliers, (attd. The South Staffordshire Regiment) (I Airborne Division) (Salcombe, Devon).

In Holland on 19th September, 1944, Major Cain was commanding a rifle company of the South Staffordshire Regiment during the Battle of Arnhem when his company was cut off from the rest of the battalion and during the next six days was closely engaged with enemy tanks, self-propelled guns and infantry. The Germans made repeated attempts to break into the company position by infiltration and had they succeeded in doing so the whole situation of the Airborne Troops would have been jeopardised.

Major Cain, by his outstanding devotion to duty and remarkable powers of leadership, was to a large extent personally responsible for saving a vital sector from falling into the hands of the enemy.

On 20th September a Tiger tank approached the area held by his company and Major Cain went out alone to deal with it armed with a P.I.A.T.. Taking up a position he held his fire until the tank was only 20 yards away when he opened up. The tank immediately halted and turned its guns on him, shooting away a corner of the house near where this officer was lying. Although wounded by machine gun bullets and falling masonry, Major Cain continued firing until he had scored several direct hits, immobilised the tank and supervised the bringing up of a 75mm. howitzer which completely destroyed it. Only then would he consent to have his wounds dressed.

In the next morning this officer drove off three more tanks by the fearless use of his P.I.A.T., on each occasion leaving cover and taking up position in open ground with complete disregard for his personal safety.

During the following days, Major Cain was everywhere where danger threatened, moving amongst his men and encouraging them by his fearless example to hold out. He refused rest and medical attention in spite of the fact that his hearing had been seriously impaired because of a perforated eardrum and he was suffering from multiple wounds.

On 25 September the enemy made a concerted attack on Major Cain's position, using self-propelled guns, flame throwers and infantry. By this time the last P.I.A.T. had been put out of action and Major Cain was armed with only a light 2" mortar. However, by a skilful use of this weapon and his daring leadership of the few men still under his command, he completely demoralized the enemy who, after an engagement lasting more than three hours, withdrew in disorder.

Throughout the whole course of the Battle of Arnhem, Major Cain showed superb gallantry. His powers of endurance and leadership were the admiration of all his fellow officers and stories of his valour were being constantly exchanged amongst the troops. His coolness and courage under incessant fire could not be surpassed.

There are some errors in Cain's citation. The action described as occurring on the 20th actually took place on the 21st, the day Lieutenant Meikle was killed while spotting for Cain. Additionally, the enemy vehicle identified as a Tiger tank was actually a StuG III self-propelled gun.

== End of the war ==
The hostilities in Europe ended on 8 May 1945, when the Allies accepted the unconditional surrender of Nazi Germany. There were, however, a large number of German units in Norway – one of the few places in Europe still under German control – and the Allies feared the German commander there might attempt to fight on. In Operation Doomsday, Cain travelled to Oslo, Norway, with the 1st Airlanding Brigade on 11 May 1945. Working with Milorg (the Norwegian resistance), the British took the surrender of German troops in Norway without incident, before returning to the UK on 25 August 1945. Having remained in the service of the South Staffordshire Regiment, Cain officially relinquished his wartime commission on 28 December 1945 and was granted the honorary rank of major.

== Later life ==
Upon leaving the army, Cain went back to his pre-war occupation with Shell, living in East Asia and then West Africa. In 1951 he was elected to the Nigerian House of Representatives while working there. He returned to Britain in 1965 and settled in the Isle of Man upon his retirement.

== Family ==
Cain and his wife had four children. His daughter, Frances Catherine Cain, was married to television presenter Jeremy Clarkson from 1993 to 2014.

== Death ==
Cain died of cancer on 2 May 1974 in Crowborough, Sussex. He was cremated at Worth Crematorium, Crawley, and his ashes were interred in the family grave at Braddan Cemetery on the Isle of Man.

== Memorials ==
There are several memorials in Cain's honour. King William's College has a memorial scholarship in his name, and the chapel in the Hospice at Douglas is dedicated in his name. An oak tree in Dhoon Arboretum, planted with acorns gathered from Arnhem, has been christened the Arnhem Oak in memory of his bravery. His Victoria Cross, Denison smock, and the maroon beret he wore during the Battle of Arnhem are all held at the Staffordshire Regiment Museum. His daughter, Frances Cain, unveiled a set of commemorative coins honouring her father on the Isle of Man in 2006. She was married to British television and motoring journalist Jeremy Clarkson, who presented a BBC documentary, The Victoria Cross: For Valour on Cain and other VC recipients in 2003. Frances Cain was unaware of her father's VC until after he died because, according to Clarkson, "he'd never thought to mention it".

== Medals and decorations ==
Victoria Cross (VC)
1939-1945 Star
Italy Star
France and Germany Star
Defence Medal
War Medal 1939-1945
Queen Elizabeth II Coronation Medal
Efficiency Decoration (TD)

== See also ==
Four other men were awarded the Victoria Cross after the battle, all of them posthumous:

- Lance-Sergeant John Daniel Baskeyfield, 2nd Battalion South Staffordshire Regiment.
- Lieutenant John Hollington Grayburn, 2nd Battalion Parachute Regiment.
- Flight Lieutenant David Samuel Anthony Lord 271 Squadron, Royal Air Force.
- Captain Lionel Ernest Queripel, 10th Battalion Parachute Regiment.
- List of Second World War Victoria Cross recipients

== Bibliography ==
- Kershaw, Robert (1990). It Never Snows in September. Ian Allan Publishing. ISBN 0-7110-2167-8.
- Margry, Karel (2002). Operation Market Garden Then and Now: Volume 2. After the Battle. ISBN 1-870067-45-2.
- Middlebrook, Martin (1994). Arnhem 1944: The Airborne Battle. Viking. ISBN 0-670-83546-3.
- Ramsey, Winston, ed. (1986). "Arnhem VC's". After the Battle - Arnhem (Special Issue): 27–30.
- Ryan, Cornelius (1999) [1974]. A Bridge Too Far. Wordsworth Editions Ltd. ISBN 1-84022-213-1.
- Waddy, John (1999). A Tour of the Arnhem Battlefields. Pen & Sword Books Limited. ISBN 0-85052-571-3.
- Wright, Michael, ed. (1989). The World at Arms. Reader's Digest.
