= John Grayburn =

Recipient of the Victoria Cross

John Hollington Grayburn
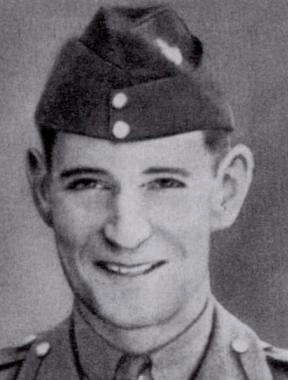
- Born: 30 January 1918; Karachi, British India
- Died: 20 September 1944 (aged 26); Arnhem, German-occupied Netherlands
- Burial place: Arnhem Oosterbeek War Cemetery, Netherlands
- Military career
- Allegiance: United Kingdom
- Branch: British Army
- Service years: 1940–1944
- Rank: Captain (posthumous)
- Nickname: "Jack"
- Service number: 149002
- Units: Oxfordshire and Buckinghamshire Light Infantry; Parachute Regiment
- Commands: 2 Platoon, A Company, 2nd Battalion, The Parachute Regiment
- Conflicts: Second World War: Western Front; Operation Market Garden; Battle of Arnhem †
- Awards: Victoria Cross

Captain John Hollington Grayburn VC (30 January 1918 – 20 September 1944) was an English recipient of the Victoria Cross, the highest and most prestigious award for gallantry in the face of the enemy that can be awarded to British and Commonwealth forces.

Born in 1918, Grayburn was educated at Sherborne School in Dorset and joined the Army Cadet Force before the outbreak of the Second World War. He was initially commissioned into the Oxfordshire and Buckinghamshire Light Infantry and later joined the Parachute Regiment. At the age of 26 he went into action in the Battle of Arnhem where he was part of the small force that was able to reach Arnhem road bridge. Between 17 and 20 September he led his platoon, and later the remnants of a battalion, in the defence of the small British perimeter around the bridge, but was killed after standing up in full view of a German tank in order to direct his men to new positions.

Grayburn is buried in the Arnhem Oosterbeek War Cemetery, and his Victoria Cross is displayed at the Parachute Regiment and Airborne Forces Museum in England.

== Early life and education ==
John Grayburn was born on 30 January 1918 on Manora Island, India, son of banker Lionel Markham Grayburn (1878–1945) and Gertrude (1879–1967), née Hollington. The family returned to England whilst he was young, and lived at Roughwood Farmhouse, Chalfont St Giles, Buckinghamshire. From 1931 to 1935 he followed his two elder brothers in attending Sherborne School in Dorset where he was a member of Abbey House. After leaving Sherborne, he joined the Hong Kong and Shanghai Banking Corporation.

Grayburn played rugby for the Chiltern Rugby Club between 1927 and 1939 and was a skilled boxer.

Grayburn joined the Army Cadet Force and was posted to the 1st (London) Cadet Force, The Queen's Royal Regiment. In September 1940 he was given an emergency commission to second lieutenant and was posted to the Oxfordshire and Buckinghamshire Light Infantry.

== Second World War ==
Grayburn was promoted to war substantive lieutenant in 1942. However, the Ox and Bucks remained on the home front and Grayburn became bored with the inactivity. Instead he applied to the Parachute Regiment and in June 1943 he was transferred to the 7th (Light Infantry) Parachute Battalion. The following year he was transferred to the regiment's 2nd Battalion, under the command of Lieutenant Colonel John Frost, and took command of 2 Platoon, A Company.

=== Battle of Arnhem ===
The Battle of Arnhem was part of Operation Market Garden, an attempt to secure a string of bridges through the Netherlands. At Arnhem the British 1st Airborne Division and Polish 1st Independent Parachute Brigade were tasked with securing bridges across the Lower Rhine, the final objectives of the operation. However, the airborne forces that dropped on 17 September were not aware that the remnants of the 9th SS and 10th SS Panzer divisions were also near Arnhem for rest and refitting. Their presence added a substantial number of Panzergrenadiers, tanks and self-propelled guns to the German defences and the Allies suffered heavily in the ensuing battle. Only a small force managed to hold one end of the Arnhem road bridge before being overrun on 21 September. The rest of the division became trapped in a small pocket west of the bridge and had to be evacuated on 25 September. The Allies failed to cross the Rhine, which remained under German control until Allied offensives in March 1945.

==== Advance to the bridge ====
1st Airborne Division's commanding officer, Major General Roy Urquhart, originally planned for the 2nd Battalion to lead the 1st Parachute Brigade into Arnhem to secure the road, rail and pontoon bridges over the Lower Rhine. Frost chose Major Digby Tatham-Warter's A Company to lead the battalion's march from the drop zones to the bridges, knowing him to be "a thruster if ever there was". A Company was in action almost at once, ambushing a small German recce group near the drop zone. The company moved off through the woods toward the river road, with each platoon taking turns to lead. There was a brief plan to advance the platoons by jeep once out of the woods, but German forces were encountered shortly afterwards and the idea was not followed up. Grayburn had just arrived at a road junction and headed north when the men behind him came under enemy fire. After laying a smokescreen he led a charge that cleared the enemy positions. Tatham-Warter lacked confidence in the Airborne radio equipment and had trained his platoons to use bugle calls; it was with the charge that Grayburn signalled that the advance could be resumed.

A Company was not significantly delayed by the German patrols it encountered later, although the presence of cheering Dutch crowds delayed the whole battalion as it passed through Oosterbeek. As they approached the railway bridge, C Company detached to capture it, but German engineers blew the bridge just as the British were starting to cross it. A Company now encountered enemy armoured cars, but successfully skirted them by manoeuvering through the back gardens of the houses on either side of the road At 8pm, as darkness fell, Grayburn's platoon led A Company into Arnhem centre and under the main ramp of Arnhem road bridge. Tatham-Warter deployed his platoons around the ramp; 2 Platoon covered both sides of the northernmost extreme of the ramp where it fed into the town centre.

==== Defence of the bridge ====
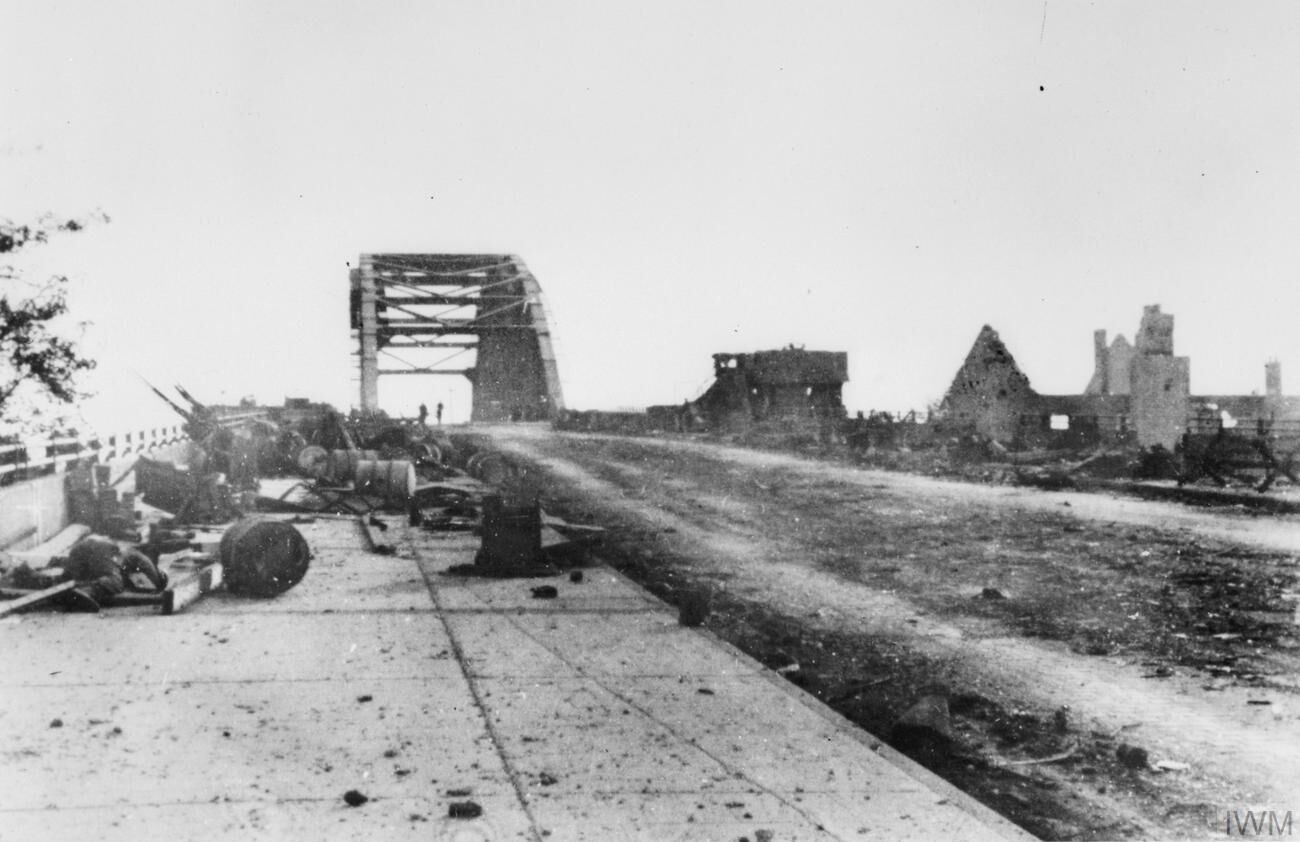
The Arnhem road bridge, photographed shortly after the British had been overrun.

Grayburn did not fire on the occasional German traffic still using the bridge, preferring not to advertise the Allied presence until the rest of the battalion had arrived. Upon his arrival, Frost began securing more buildings around the ramp, and a small section attack was made on the bridge. The German defenders quickly repulsed this however and Tatham-Warter organised a stronger attack, to be led by Grayburn.

As soon as it was sufficiently dark, Grayburn led his platoon along the ramp to the bridge, their faces blackened and their boots muffled with strips of torn up curtains. The platoon moved forward on either side of the girders along the sides of the road, but was quickly spotted by enemy forces on the bridge. Grayburn was shot in the shoulder but continued to press his men on, until the withering enemy fire became too intense and he was forced to pull them back. He was the last person to descend from the ramp into cover.

Over the next few days, every man of the 700 or so who had made it to the bridge and whether a combat trooper or not, was engaged in the defence of the British perimeter. A Company was sited in the buildings on either side of the ramp nearest the river, and on Monday 18 2 Platoon occupied a house on the east side. This sector came under increasing attack from tanks and infantry of the 10th SS Panzer Division, and the building was later burnt down.

The rest of the division made several efforts to reinforce Frost's men, but were unable to break through the German forces that surrounded the bridge. The exact disposition of the British troops subsequently became more confused as the battle developed into house to house fighting. Tatham-Warter took command of 2nd Battalion on Tuesday 19, and Grayburn temporarily took command of A Company after Tatham-Warter's designated replacement was wounded. Grayburn led several fighting patrols that forced the Germans to commit more armour but as Wednesday 20 dawned, the British position was becoming untenable. As the Germans squeezed the perimeter they laid explosives on a section of the ramp crossing a road next to the riverbank, lest XXX Corps should break through and capture the bridge from the south. Grayburn led another patrol that forced the enemy away from the arch while Royal Engineers removed the fuzes. Grayburn was wounded again but quickly returned after being treated, now with his head bandaged and arm in a sling. German infantry later returned to relay the charges and a second patrol went out to remove them. A German tank had come forward to cover the arch, but in order to direct his men to better positions Grayburn stood up in full view of it. The tank's machine gun killed him instantly.

Frost's perimeter gradually shrank as men and ammunition ran low, and Frost himself was wounded on 20 September. A brief ceasefire was held later that day to allow the evacuation of wounded men in danger of becoming trapped and being burned alive in the cellars of wrecked buildings. Despite the best efforts of the remaining men to hold out overnight, they were finally overrun in the early hours of 21 September.

== Victoria Cross ==
A Victoria Cross

Major Tatham-Warter was able to escape German captivity and later led nearly 140 men to safety in Operation Pegasus. Upon his return to England he wrote a report on the action at the bridge, which led to Grayburn's posthumous promotion to captain and the award of the Victoria Cross.

The full citation for Grayburn's Victoria Cross appeared in a supplement to the London Gazette on 23 January 1945, reading:

War Office, 25th January, 1945.

The KING has been graciously pleased to approve the posthumous award of the VICTORIA CROSS to: —

Lieutenant John Hollington Grayburn (149002), Parachute Regiment, Army Air Corps (Chalfont St. Giles).

For supreme courage, leadership and devotion to duty.

Lieutenant Grayburn was a platoon commander of the Parachute Battalion which was dropped on 17th September, 1944, with the task of seizing and holding the bridge over the Rhine at Arnhem.

North end of the bridge was captured and, early in the night, Lieutenant Grayburn was ordered to assault and capture the Southern end with his platoon. He led his platoon on to the bridge and began the attack with the utmost determination, but the platoon was met by a hail of fire from two 20 mm. quick firing guns, and from the machine guns of an armoured car. Almost at once Lieutenant Grayburn was shot through the shoulder. Although there was no cover on the bridge, and in spite of his wound, Lieutenant Grayburn continued to press forward with the greatest dash and bravery until casualties became so heavy that he was ordered to withdraw. He directed the withdrawal from the bridge personally and was himself the last man to come off the embankment into comparative cover.

Later, his platoon was ordered to occupy a house which was vital to the defence of the bridge and he personally organised the occupation of the house.

Throughout the next day and night the enemy made ceaseless attacks on the house, using not only infantry with mortars and machine guns but also tanks and self-propelled guns. The house was very exposed and difficult to defend and the fact that it did not fall to the enemy must be attributed to Lieutenant Grayburn's great courage and inspiring leadership. He constantly exposed himself to the enemy's fire while moving among, and encouraging, his platoon, and seemed completely oblivious to danger.

On 19th September, 1944, the enemy renewed his attacks, which increased in intensity, as the house was vital to the defence of the bridge. All attacks were repulsed, due to Lieutenant Grayburn's valour and skill in organising and encouraging his men, until eventually the house was set on fire and had to be evacuated.

Lieutenant Grayburn then took command of elements of all arms, including the remainder of his own company, and re-formed them into a fighting force. He spent the night organising a defensive position to cover the approaches to the bridge.

On 20 September 1944, he extended his defence by a series of fighting patrols which prevented the enemy gaining access to the houses in the vicinity, the occupation of which would have prejudiced the defence of the bridge. This forced the enemy to bring up tanks which brought Lieutenant Grayburn's positions under such heavy fire that he was forced to withdraw to an area farther North. The enemy now attempted to lay demolition charges under the bridge and the situation was critical. Realising this, Lieutenant Grayburn organised and led a fighting patrol which drove the enemy off temporarily, and gave time for the fuzes to be removed. He was again wounded, this time in the back, but refused to be evacuated.

Finally, an enemy tank, against which Lieutenant Grayburn had no defence, approached so close to his position that it became untenable. He then stood up in full view of the tank and personally directed the withdrawal of his men to the main defensive perimeter to which he had been ordered.

He was killed that night.

From the evening of September 17th until the night of September 20th, 1944, a period of over three days, Lieutenant Grayburn led his men with supreme gallantry and determination. Although in pain and weakened by his wounds, short of food and without sleep, his courage never flagged. There is no doubt that, had it not been for this officer's inspiring leadership and personal bravery, the Arnhem bridge could never have been held for this time.

== Personal life ==
In 1942, Grayburn married (Dorothy Constance) Marcelle (1919–1964), daughter of Lieutenant Colonel Charles Ernest Chambers; they had a son, John (born 1943). Marcelle Grayburn subsequently married Sir Alastair Young, 2nd Baronet; her first husband's elder brother, William Grayburn, was married to Young's sister Barbara.

== Legacy ==
After his death, Grayburn was buried on the bridge embankment close to where he was killed. His remains were recovered in 1948 and added to the Arnhem Oosterbeek War Cemetery. Although most graves in the cemetery are organised by unit, Grayburn's is separate from the other parachute formations. His VC is in the care of the Parachute Regiment and Airborne Forces Museum and there are plaques in his memory at Chalfont St Giles parish church, and at the Hong Kong and Shanghai Banking Corporation war memorial in Hong Kong, where Grayburn's uncle worked before the war. He is also commemorated on the Sherborne School War Memorial and in the Sherborne School Book of Remembrance. A room in the clubhouse of Amersham and Chiltern Rugby Club is named after him. He is also named prominently on the front panel of the plinth unveiled at the new student accommodation in James Wolfe Road, Oxford on 16 August 2019 at the site of Cowley Barracks.

== See also ==
Four other men were awarded the Victoria Cross at Arnhem:

- Major Robert Henry Cain, 2nd Battalion South Staffordshire Regiment.
- Lance-Sergeant John Daniel Baskeyfield, 2nd Battalion South Staffordshire Regiment.
- Flight Lieutenant David Samuel Anthony Lord, 271 Squadron, Royal Air Force.
- Captain Lionel Ernest Queripel, 10th Battalion Parachute Regiment.

List of Second World War Victoria Cross recipients

== Bibliography ==
- Frost, Major General John (1980). A Drop Too Many. Cassell. ISBN 0-85052-927-1.
- Harclerode, Peter (2000). Arnhem: A Tragedy of Errors. Caxton Editions. ISBN 1-84067-146-7.
- Kershaw, Robert (1990). It Never Snows in September. Ian Allan Publishing. ISBN 0-7110-2167-8.
- Middlebrook, Martin (1994). Arnhem 1944: The Airborne Battle. Viking. ISBN 0-670-83546-3.
- Ryan, Cornelius (1999) [1974]. A Bridge Too Far. Wordsworth Editions Ltd. ISBN 1-84022-213-1.
- Waddy, John (1999). A Tour of the Arnhem Battlefields. Pen & Sword Books Limited. ISBN 0-85052-571-3.
