= List of Second World War Victoria Cross recipients =

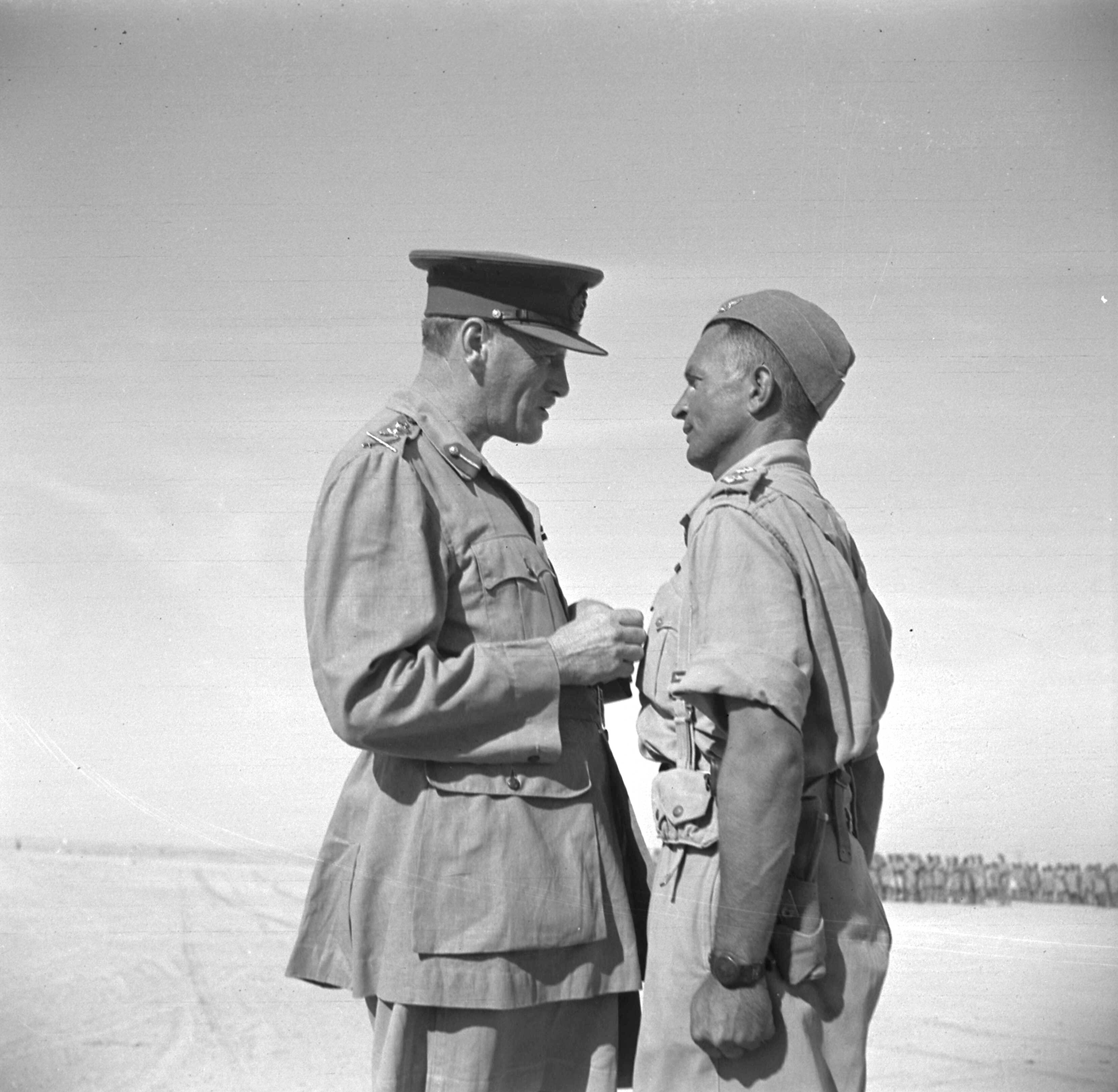
Second Lieutenant Charles Upham being presented with the Victoria Cross by General Sir Claude Auchinleck on 4 November 1941. Upham was awarded a bar to the medal in 1945.

The Victoria Cross (VC) is a military decoration awarded for valour "in the face of the enemy" to members of armed forces of some Commonwealth countries and previous British Empire territories. It takes precedence over all other Orders, decorations and medals; it may be awarded to a person of any rank in any service and to civilians under military command. The award was officially constituted when Queen Victoria issued a warrant under the Royal sign-manual on 29 January 1856 that was gazetted on 5 February 1856. The order was backdated to 1854 to recognise acts of valour during the Crimean War. The first awards ceremony was held on 26 June 1857, where Queen Victoria invested 62 of the 111 Crimean recipients in a ceremony in Hyde Park.

The Victoria Cross was awarded 182 times to 181 recipients for action in the Second World War. The war, also known as World War II (WWII), was a global military conflict that involved a majority of the world's nations, including all of the great powers, organised into two opposing military alliances: the Allies and the Axis. The war involved the mobilisation of more than 100 million military personnel, making it the most widespread war in history. In a state of "total war", the major participants placed their entire economic, industrial, and scientific capabilities at the service of the war effort, erasing the distinction between civilian and military resources. Throughout the six-year duration of the war, weapons and technology improved rapidly, including the use of jet aircraft, radar and nuclear weapons. More than 70 million people, the majority of whom were civilians, were killed, making it the deadliest conflict in human history.

The start of the war is generally held to be 1 September 1939, with the German invasion of Poland and subsequent declarations of war on Germany by most of the Crown Colonies of the British Empire and Commonwealth, and by France. The first Victoria Cross of the war was awarded to Gerard Roope for action whilst in command of HMS Glowworm (although not gazetted until 1945). The war at sea began immediately after war was declared with the Battle of the Atlantic, in which German U-boats attempted to disrupt and destroy allied convoys. Throughout the war the Royal Navy was tasked with guarding vital shipping lanes and enabling amphibious operations across the globe; the St Nazaire Raid saw five Victoria Crosses awarded. The Battle of the Mediterranean was fought throughout the war and included the Battle of Taranto and Battle of Matapan, as well as protecting convoys including the Malta convoys. In total, 23 servicemen from the Royal Navy were awarded the Victoria Cross including one Royal Marine. Aerial warfare came into its own in World War II with several distinct roles emerging. The role of fighter planes developed during the Battle of Britain, where the Royal Air Force fought for air superiority against the Luftwaffe. The Battle of Britain was the first major campaign to be fought entirely by air forces. It was the largest and most sustained bombing campaign until that date. Initially, RAF airfields were attacked, however as the battle progressed, operations were extended to the strategic level with The Blitz. Britain also conducted controversial strategic bombing campaigns in Europe and Asia; they involved hundreds of aircraft dropping tens of thousands of tons of munitions over a single city. Tactical strikes were also carried out by the RAF including Operation Chastise, where No. 617 Squadron RAF attacked German dams in the Ruhr valley using "bouncing bombs"; Guy Gibson was awarded the Victoria Cross for this action.

The war on the land did not begin until May 1940, as Britain and France were involved in a Phoney War between Germany and the Franco-British alliance. The phoney war ended with the Battle of France where Germany invaded Benelux and subsequently France, which forced British troops to escape from Dunkirk. In 1941, war spread to the Middle East and North Africa as well as the East African Campaign. The United States officially joined the war in December 1941 after the Japanese Attack on Pearl Harbor. In 1942, British forces under Lieutenant General Bernard Montgomery defeated the Axis forces of General Erwin Rommel in the Second Battle of El Alamein, which marked a major turning point in the Western Desert campaign and the North African campaign. It ended Axis hopes of occupying Egypt, taking control of the Suez Canal, and gaining access to the Middle Eastern oil fields. Nine VCs were awarded for action in the Western Desert Campaign. By 1943, the war was being fought in several theatres, including the Pacific, North Africa and Southeast Asia. The Burma campaign of the Pacific War took place from 1942 to 1945, and saw 29 Victoria Crosses awarded. By 1944 and the Allied invasion of Normandy, the Allies were making ground in several theatres including advances in the Burma campaign. In Europe, the unsuccessful raid on Arnhem saw five soldiers awarded the Victoria Cross, four posthumously. In May 1945, the Allies accepted the unconditional surrender of German forces, celebrated with VE Day. Actions after VE Day until the war in the Pacific was ended with the surrender of Japan on board USS Missouri on 2 September 1945. saw seven Commonwealth servicemen awarded the VC.

Charles Upham received the Victoria Cross and Bar; two awards for two acts. Upham was only the third recipient of the Victoria Cross and Bar, and the first for combatant actions; the previous two recipients were medical officers of the Royal Army Medical Corps.

Of the 181 recipients 85 (46.96%) were awarded posthumously.

== Recipients ==
- This along with a * indicates a posthumous award

Name	Unit	Date of action	Place of action
Arthur Aaron	No. 218 Squadron RAF	12 August 1943*	Turin, Italy^{[A]}
Michael Allmand	6th Gurkha Rifles	11 June 1944; 23 June 1944*	Pin Hmi Road Bridge, Burma
Charles Anderson	2/19th Battalion, AIF	18–22 January 1942	Muar, Malaya
Eric Anderson	East Yorkshire Regiment	6 April 1943*	Battle of Wadi Akarit, Tunisia
John Anderson	Argyll and Sutherland Highlanders (Princess Louise's)	23 April 1943	Longstop Hill, Tunisia
Richard Annand	Durham Light Infantry	15–16 May 1940	River Dyle, Belgium
Cyril Barton	No. 578 Squadron RAF	30 March 1944*	Nuremberg, Germany^{[A]}
John Baskeyfield	South Staffordshire Regiment	20 September 1944*	Arnhem, the Netherlands
Sidney Bates	Royal Norfolk Regiment	6 August 1944*^{[C]}	Sourdeval, France
Ian Bazalgette	No. 635 Squadron RAF	4 August 1944*	Trossy St. Maximin, France^{[A]}
Stephen Beattie	HMS Campbeltown	27 March 1942	St Nazaire, France
John Beeley	King's Royal Rifle Corps	21 November 1941*	Sidi Rezegh, Libya
Premindra Bhagat	Corps of Indian Engineers	31 January 1941 to 1 February 1941	Gallabat, Abyssinia
Frank Blaker	9th Gurkha Rifles	9 July 1944*	Taunggyi, Burma
John Brunt	Sherwood Foresters (Nottinghamshire and Derbyshire Regiment)	9 December 1944*	Faenza, Italy
Richard Burton	Duke of Wellington's (West Riding) Regiment	8 October 1944	Monte Ceco, Italy
Robert Cain	South Staffordshire Regiment	17–25 September 1944	Arnhem, the Netherlands
George Cairns	South Staffordshire Regiment	13 March 1944*^{[C]}	Henu Block, Burma
Donald Cameron	HMS X6	22 September 1943	Kåfjord, Norway
John Campbell	Royal Horse Artillery	21–23 November 1941	Sidi Rezegh, Libya
Kenneth Campbell	No. 22 Squadron RAF	6 April 1941*	Brest, France^{[A]}
Lorne Campbell	Argyll and Sutherland Highlanders (Princess Louise's)	6 April 1943	Wadi Akarit, Tunisia
Edward Chapman	Monmouthshire Regiment	2 April 1945	Dortmund-Ems Canal, Germany
Edward Charlton	Irish Guards	21 April 1945*	Wistedt, Germany
Leonard Cheshire	No. 35 Squadron RAF; No. 76 Squadron RAF; No. 617 Squadron RAF	June 1940–July 1944^{[D]}	Over Europe^{[A]}
Albert Chowne	2/2nd Battalion, AIF	25 March 1945*	Dagua, New Guinea
Aubrey Cosens	Queen's Own Rifles of Canada	25–26 February 1945*	Mooshof, Germany
John Cruickshank	No. 210 Squadron RAF	17–18 July 1944	Atlantic Ocean^{[A]}
Arthur Cumming	Frontier Force Regiment	3 January 1942	Kuantan, Malaya
David Currie	South Alberta Regiment	18–20 August 1944	Battle of Falaise, France
Roden Cutler	Royal Australian Artillery	19 June 1941 to 6 July 1941	Merdjayoun-Damour, Lebanon
Tom Derrick	2/48th Battalion, AIF	24 November 1943	Sattelberg, New Guinea
Fazal Din	10th Baluch Regiment	2 March 1945*	Meiktila, Burma
Dennis Donnini	Royal Scots Fusiliers	18 January 1945*	Stein, (Selfkant) Germany
Thomas Durrant	Corps of Royal Engineers	27 March 1942*^{[C]}	St Nazaire, France
George Eardley	King's Shropshire Light Infantry	16 October 1944	Overloon, the Netherlands
John Edmondson	2/17th Battalion, AIF	13–14 April 1941*^{[C]}	Tobruk, Libya
Hughie Edwards	No. 105 Squadron RAF	4 July 1941	Bremen, Germany^{[A]}
Keith Elliott	22nd Battalion, NZEF	15 July 1942	Ruweisat, Egypt
Harold Ervine-Andrews	East Lancashire Regiment	31 May 1940 to 1 June 1940	Dunkirk, France
Eugene Esmonde	825 Naval Air Squadron	12 February 1942*	Straits of Dover, England^{[A]}
Edward Fegen	HMS Jervis Bay	5 November 1940*	Atlantic Ocean
Henry Foote	7th Royal Tank Regiment	27 May 1942 to 15 June 1942	Libya
John Foote	Royal Canadian Army Chaplain Corps	19 August 1942	Dieppe, France
Ian Fraser	HMS XE3	31 July 1945	Johore Straits, Singapore
John French	2/9th Battalion, AIF	4 September 1942*	Milne Bay, New Guinea
Christopher Furness	Welsh Guards	17–24 May 1940*	Arras, France
Philip Gardner	4th Royal Tank Regiment	23 November 1941	Tobruk, Libya
Donald Garland	No. 12 Squadron RAF	12 May 1940*	Albert Canal, Belgium^{[A]}
Yeshwant Ghadge	Maratha Light Infantry	10 July 1944*	Upper Tiber Valley, Italy
Gaje Ghale	5th Gurkha Rifles	24 May 1943	Chin Hills, Burma
Guy Gibson	No. 617 Squadron RAF	16 May 1943^{[E]}	Möhne Dam, Germany^{[A]}
James Gordon	2/31st Battalion, AIF	10 July 1941	Djezzine, Syria
Thomas Gould	HMS Thrasher	16 February 1942	Crete, Mediterranean Sea
Percival Gratwick	2/48th Battalion, AIF	25–26 October 1942*	Miteiriya Ridge, Egypt
Robert Gray (RCNVR)	HMS Formidable	9 August 1945*	Honshū, Japan^{[A]}
Thomas Gray	No. 12 Squadron RAF	12 May 1940*	Albert Canal, Belgium^{[A]}
John Grayburn	Parachute Regiment	17–20 September 1944*	Arnhem, the Netherlands
George Gristock	Royal Norfolk Regiment	21 May 1940*^{[C]}	River Escaut, Belgium
George Gunn	3rd Regiment Royal Horse Artillery	21 November 1941*	Sidi Rezegh, Libya
Arthur Gurney	2/48th Battalion, AIF	22 July 1942*	El Alamein, Egypt
Bhanbhagta Gurung	2nd Gurkha Rifles	5 March 1945	Tamandu, Burma
Lachhiman Gurung	8th Gurkha Rifles	12–13 May 1945	Taungdaw, Burma
Thaman Gurung	5th Gurkha Rifles	10 November 1944*	Monte San Bartolo, Italy
Abdul Hafiz	9th Jat Infantry	6 April 1944*	Imphal, India
Ali Haidar	13th Frontier Force Rifles	9 April 1945	Fusignano, Italy
John Hannah	No. 83 Squadron RAF	15 September 1940	Antwerp, Belgium^{[A]}
Eric Harden	Royal Army Medical Corps	23 January 1945*	Brachterbeek, the Netherlands
John Harman	Queen's Own Royal West Kent Regiment	8–9 April 1944*	Kohima, India
John Harper	York and Lancaster Regiment	29 September 1944*	Antwerp, Belgium
Jack Hinton	2nd Division, NZEF	29 April 1941	Kalamai, Greece
Charles Hoey	Lincolnshire Regiment	16 February 1944*	Ngakyedauk Pass, Burma
Stanley Hollis	Green Howards	6 June 1944	Normandy, France
David Hornell	No. 162 Squadron RCAF	24 June 1944*	Faroes, Atlantic Ocean^{[A]}
Alec Horwood	Queen's Royal Regiment (West Surrey)	18–20 January 1944*	Kyauchaw, Burma
Clive Hulme	2nd Division, NZEF	20–28 May 1941	Crete, Greece
Thomas Hunter	43 Commando	2 April 1945*	Lake Comacchio, Italy
James Jackman	Royal Northumberland Fusiliers	25 November 1941*	Tobruk, Libya
Norman Jackson	No. 106 Squadron RAF	26 April 1944	Schweinfurt, Germany^{[A]}
Namdeo Jadav	Maratha Light Infantry	9 April 1945	Senio River, Italy
David Jamieson	Royal Norfolk Regiment	7–8 August 1944	Grimbosq, France
Francis Jefferson	Lancashire Fusiliers	16 May 1944	Monte Cassino, Italy
Karamjeet Judge	15th Punjab Regiment	18 March 1945*	Meiktila, Burma
Richard Kelliher	2/25th Battalion, AIF	13 September 1943	New Guinea
Edward Kenna	2/4th Battalion, AIF	15 May 1945	Wewak, New Guinea
John Kenneally	Irish Guards	28 April 1943	Dj. Arada, Tunisia
Geoffrey Keyes	No. 11 (Scottish) Commando	17–18 November 1941*	Beda Littoria, Libya
William Kibby	2/48th Battalion, AIF	23–31 October 1942*	El Alamein, Egypt
Bruce Kingsbury	2/14th Battalion, AIF	29 August 1942	Isurava, New Guinea
George Knowland	No. 1 Commando	31 January 1945*	Kangaw, Burma
Ganju Lama	7th Gurkha Rifles	12 June 1944	Ningthoukhong, India
Anders Lassen	Special Air Service	8–9 April 1945*	Lake Comacchio, Italy
Herbert Le Patourel	Hampshire Regiment	3 December 1942	Tebourba, Tunisia
Nigel Leakey	King's African Rifles	19 May 1941*	Colito, Abyssinia
Roderick Learoyd	No. 49 Squadron RAF	12 August 1940	Dortmund-Ems Canal, Germany^{[A]}
Ian Liddell	Coldstream Guards	3 April 1945	Lingen, Germany
John Linton	HMS Pandora; HMS Turbulent	September 1939 to 23 March 1943*^{[D]}	Mediterranean Sea
David Lord	No. 271 Squadron RAF	19 September 1944*	Arnhem, the Netherlands^{[A]}
Charles Lyell	Scots Guards	22–27 April 1943*	Dj Bou Arada, Tunisia
John Mackey	2/3rd Pioneer Battalion, AIF	12 May 1945*	Tarakan Island, Borneo
James Magennis	HMS XE3	31 July 1945	Johore Straits, Singapore
John Mahony	Westminster Regiment	24 May 1944	River Melfa, Italy
Hugh Malcolm	No. 18 Squadron RAF	4 December 1942*	Chougui, Tunisia^{[A]}
Leslie Manser	No. 50 Squadron RAF	30 May 1942*	Cologne, Germany^{[A]}
Jack Mantle	HMS Foylebank	4 July 1940*	Portland, England
Charles Merritt	South Saskatchewan Regiment	19 August 1942	Dieppe, France
Ron Middleton (RAAF)	No. 149 Squadron RAF	28 November 1942*	Turin, Italy^{[A]}
Anthony Miers	HMS Torbay	4–5 March 1942	Corfu, Greece
George Mitchell	London Scottish	23–24 January 1944*	Damiano Ridge, Italy
Andrew Mynarski	No. 419 Squadron RCAF	12 June 1944*	Cambrai, France^{[A]}
John Nettleton	No. 44 Squadron RAF	17 April 1942	Augsburg, Germany^{[A]}
Augustus Newman	Essex Regiment	28 March 1942	St Nazaire, France
William Newton	No. 22 Squadron RAAF	16–18 March 1943*^{[D]}^{[F]}	New Guinea^{[A]}
Moana-Nui-a-Kiwa Ngarimu	28th Māori Battalion, NZEF	26–27 March 1943*	Tebaga Gap, Tunisia
Harry Nicholls	Grenadier Guards	21 May 1940	River Escaut, Belgium
Eric Nicolson	No. 249 Squadron RAF	16 August 1940	Southampton, England^{[A]}
Gerard Norton	Kaffrarian Rifles, South African Army	31 August 1944	Montegridolfo, Italy
John Osborn	Winnipeg Grenadiers	19 December 1941*	Mount Butler, Hong Kong
Robert Palmer	No. 109 Squadron RAF	23 December 1944*^{[D]}	Cologne, Germany^{[A]}
Frank Partridge	8th Battalion (Australia)	24 July 1945	Bougainville, New Guinea
Frederick Peters	HMS Walney	8 November 1942	Oran, Algeria
Basil Place	HMS X7	22 September 1943	Kåfjord, Norway
Patrick Porteous	Royal Regiment of Artillery	19 August 1942	Dieppe, France
Tul Pun	6th Gurkha Rifles	23 June 1944	Mogaung, Burma
Lionel Queripel	10th Parachute Battalion	19 September 1944*	Arnhem, the Netherlands
Agansing Rai	5th Gurkha Rifles	26 June 1944	Bishenpur, India
Bhandari Ram	10th Baluch Regiment	22 November 1944	Arakan, Burma
Chhelu Ram	6th Rajputana Rifles	19–20 April 1943*	Djebel Garci, Tunisia
Kamal Ram	8th Punjab Regiment	12 May 1944	River Gari, Italy
Richhpal Ram	6th Rajputana Rifles	7–8 February 1941	Keren, Eritrea
John Randle	Royal Norfolk Regiment	4–6 May 1944*	Kohima, India
Reginald Rattey	25th Battalion (Australia)	22 March 1945	Bougainville, Solomon Islands
Claud Raymond	Corps of Royal Engineers	21 March 1945*^{[C]}	Talaku, Burma
William Reid	No. 61 Squadron RAF	3 November 1943	Düsseldorf, Germany^{[A]}
Peter Roberts	HMS Thrasher	16 February 1942	Crete, Mediterranean Sea
Maurice Rogers	Wiltshire Regiment	3 June 1944	Anzio, Italy
Gerard Roope	HMS Glowworm	8 April 1940	Norwegian Sea, off Trondheim
Robert Ryder	HMS Campbeltown	28 March 1942	St Nazaire, France
Willward Sandys-Clarke	Loyal Regiment (North Lancashire)	23 April 1943*	Guiriat El Atach, Tunisia
William Savage	HM Motor Gun Boat	28 March 1942*	St Nazaire, France
Arthur Scarf	No. 62 Squadron RAF	9 December 1941*	Singora, Malaya^{[A]}
Derek Seagrim	Green Howards	20–21 March 1943	Mareth Line, Tunisia
Alfred Sephton	HMS Coventry	18 May 1941*^{[C]}	Crete, Mediterranean Sea
Sher Shah	16th Punjab Regiment	19–20 January 1945*	Kyeyebyin, Burma
Robert Sherbrooke	HMS Onslow	31 December 1942	North Cape, Norway
William Sidney	Grenadier Guards	8–9 February 1944	Anzio, Italy
Gian Singh	15th Punjab Regiment	2 March 1945	Myingyan, Burma
Nand Singh	Sikh Regiment	11–12 March 1944	Maungdaw–Buthidaung Road, Burma
Parkash Singh	8th Punjab Regiment	6 January 1943	Donbaik, Burma
Prakash Singh Chib	13th Frontier Force Rifles	16–17 February 1945*	Kanlan Ywathit, Burma
Ram Singh	1st Punjab Regiment	25 October 1944*	Tiddim, Burma
Umrao Singh	Royal Indian Artillery	15–16 December 1944	Kaladan Valley, Burma
Ernest Smith	Seaforth Highlanders of Canada	21–22 October 1944	River Savio, Italy
Quentin Smythe	Royal Natal Carabineers, South African Army	5 June 1942	Alem Hamza, Egypt
Richard Stannard	HMT Arab	28 April 1940 to 2 May 1940	Namsos, Norway
Leslie Starcevich	2/43rd Battalion, AIF	28 June 1945	Beaufort, Borneo
James Stokes	King's Shropshire Light Infantry	1 March 1945*	Kervenheim, Germany
Sefanaia Sukanaivalu	Fiji Infantry Regiment	23 June 1944*	Bougainville, Solomon Islands
Edwin Swales (SAAF)	No. 582 Squadron RAF	23 February 1945*	Pforzheim, Germany^{[A]}
Lalbahadur Thapa	2nd Gurkha Rifles	5–6 April 1943	Rass-es-Zouai, Tunisia
Netrabahadur Thapa	5th Gurkha Rifles	25–26 June 1944	Bishenpur, India
Sher Thapa	9th Gurkha Rifles	18–19 September 1944*	San Marino, Italy
George Thompson	No. 9 Squadron RAF	1 January 1945*^{[C]}	Dortmund-Ems Canal, Germany^{[A]}
Frederick Tilston	Essex Scottish Regiment	1 March 1945	Uedem, Germany
Frederick Topham	1st Canadian Parachute Battalion	24 March 1945	Rhine, Germany
Leonard Trent	No. 487 Squadron RNZAF	3 May 1943	Amsterdam, the Netherlands^{[A]}
Lloyd Trigg (RNZAF)	No. 200 Squadron RAF	11 August 1943*	Atlantic Ocean^{[A]}
Paul Triquet	Royal 22^{e} Régiment	14 December 1943	Casa Berardi, Italy
Hanson Turner	West Yorkshire Regiment (The Prince of Wales's Own)	6–7 June 1944*	Ningthoukhong, India
Victor Turner	Rifle Brigade (Prince Consort's Own)	27 October 1942	El Alamein, Egypt
Charles Upham	2nd Division, NZEF	22–30 May 1941; 14–15 July 1942^{[B]}	Crete, Greece; El Ruweisat Ridge, Egypt
Richard Wakeford	Hampshire Regiment	13 May 1944	Cassino, Italy
Adam Wakenshaw	Durham Light Infantry	27 June 1942*	Mersa Matruh, Egypt
Malcolm Wanklyn	HMS Upholder	24 May 1941	Sicily, Mediterranean Sea
Bernard Warburton-Lee	HMS Hardy	10 April 1940*	Ofotfjord, Norway
James Ward RNZAF	No. 75 Squadron RAF	7 July 1941	Munster, Germany^{[A]}
Tasker Watkins	Welch Regiment	16 August 1944	Barfour, France
Basil Weston	Green Howards	3 March 1945*	Meiktila, Burma
Thomas Wilkinson	HMS Li Wo	14 February 1942*	Java Sea, Malaya
Eric Wilson	East Surrey Regiment	11–15 August 1940	Observation Hill, Somaliland
Peter Wright	Coldstream Guards	25 September 1943	Salerno, Italy

== Notes ==
- A Victoria Cross was awarded for actions during air combat.
- B This was a Bar to the Victoria Cross
- C Recipient died of their wounds
- D Recipient awarded the Victoria Cross for an extended period of sustained courage and outstanding leadership, rather than a single act of valour.
- E Gibson was awarded the Victoria Cross primarily for the raid, but also for leadership and valour demonstrated as master bomber on many previous sorties.
- F Newton was captured by Japanese Forces and beheaded 11 days later.
- G Sergeant H.V. Turner, Subedar Netrabahadur Thapa, Naik Agansing Rai and Rifleman Ganju Lama won their VCs in combat in the state of Manipur in India but the citations wrongly referred to the locations as being in Burma. These errors have been rectified in the list above.
