= John Baskeyfield =

British Army soldier (1922–1944)

John Baskeyfield VC
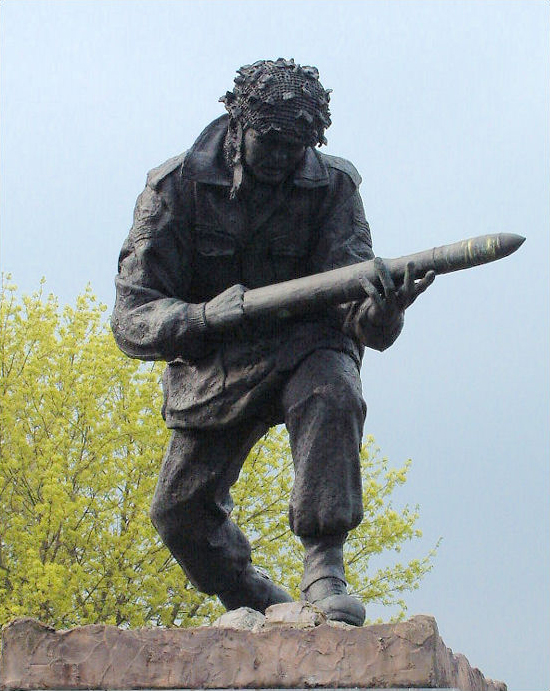
- John Baskeyfield memorial statue at Festival Heights in Stoke-on-Trent, Staffordshire.
- Born: 18 November 1922; Burslem, Stoke-on-Trent, Staffordshire, England
- Died: 20 September 1944 (aged 21); Oosterbeek, Netherlands
- Military career
- Allegiance: United Kingdom
- Branch: British Army
- Service years: 1942–1944
- Rank: Lance sergeant
- Service number: 5057916
- Unit: South Staffordshire Regiment
- Conflicts: Second World War; Allied invasion of Sicily; Operation Ladbroke; Allied invasion of Italy; Operation Slapstick; Operation Market Garden; Battle of Arnhem; Defense of Oosterbeek perimeter †
- Awards: Victoria Cross

John Daniel Baskeyfield VC (18 November 1922 – 20 September 1944) was a British Army soldier and an English recipient of the Victoria Cross (VC), the highest award for gallantry in the face of the enemy that can be awarded to members of the British and Commonwealth armed forces.

Born in 1922, Baskeyfield was called up to the British Army in early 1942. He served with the 2nd Battalion, South Staffordshire Regiment, a glider infantry unit of the 1st Airlanding Brigade, part of the 1st Airborne Division, in Sicily and Italy in 1943 before returning to the United Kingdom. The division was next deployed in Operation Market Garden and fought in the subsequent Battle of Arnhem.

While defending the Oosterbeek perimeter three days into the battle, Baskeyfield commanded a pair of anti-tank guns that destroyed several enemy tanks before the crews were killed. Baskeyfield subsequently fired the guns alone before he too was killed. His body was not identified after the war and he has no known grave.

== Early life ==
John Baskeyfield was born on 18 November 1922 in Burslem, Stoke-on-Trent, England, the son of Daniel and Minnie Baskeyfield. He trained and worked as a butcher during the early years of the Second World War, until he received his call up papers in February 1942 at the age of 19.

== Early military service ==
Baskeyfield joined the South Staffordshire Regiment and served with the 2nd Battalion's anti-tank platoon. The 2nd Battalion was part of the 1st Airlanding Brigade, itself part of the 1st Airborne Division and Baskeyfield accompanied them to North Africa, from where they took part in Operation Ladbroke, the glider-borne element of the Invasion of Sicily in 1943. The division then landed in Italy as part of Operation Slapstick and spent some weeks fighting their way through the country before sailing back to England.

== Battle of Arnhem ==
The Battle of Arnhem was part of Operation Market Garden, an attempt to secure a string of bridges through the Netherlands. At Arnhem the British 1st Airborne Division and Polish 1st Independent Parachute Brigade were tasked with securing bridges across the Lower Rhine, the final objectives of the operation. However, the airborne forces that dropped on 17 September were not aware that the 9th SS and 10th SS Panzer divisions were also near Arnhem for rest and refit. Their presence added a substantial number of Panzergrenadiers, tanks and self-propelled guns to the German defences and the Allies suffered heavily in the ensuing battle. Only a small force managed to hold one end of the Arnhem road bridge before being overrun on 21 September. The rest of the division became trapped in a small pocket west of the bridge and had to be evacuated on 25 September in Operation Berlin. The Allies failed to cross the Rhine, which remained under German control until Allied offensives in March 1945.

=== South Staffordshire's advance ===
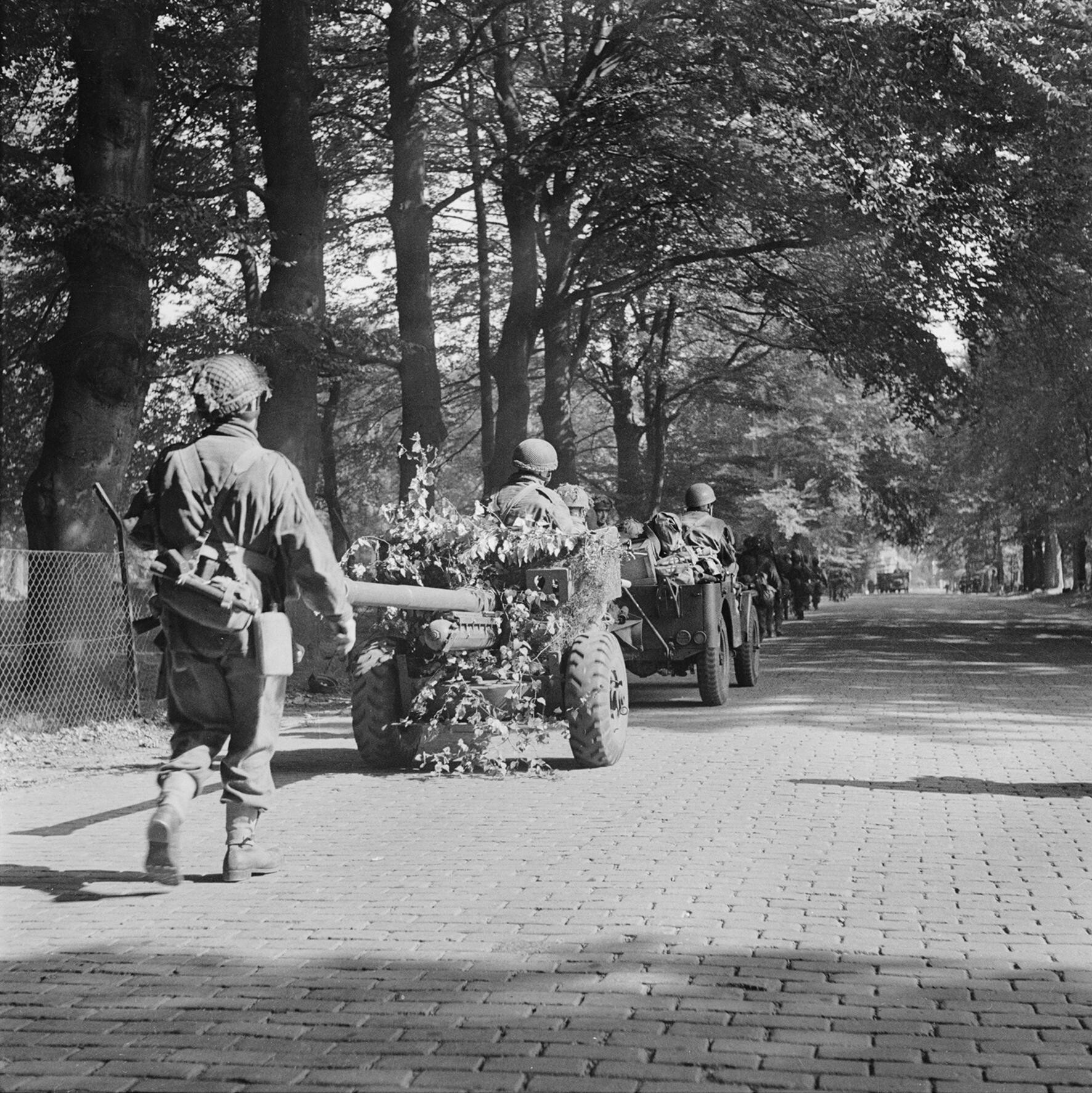
Men of the 2nd Battalion, South Staffordshire Regiment advance toward Arnhem, towing a 6 pounder anti–tank gun with them, 18 September.

Owing to a shortage of aircraft, the Allies planned to fly the entire division to Arnhem over three days. The South Staffordshire Battalion was split between the lifts on day one and day two; most of the unit arrived on day one, with the rest arriving with the second lift. The battalion's anti-tank guns were flown from RAF Manston on day one.

Major General Roy Urquhart's original plan envisaged the 1st Airlanding Brigade securing the drop zones for subsequent lifts, but by the end of day one the Allied advance into Arnhem had stalled. Only a small group of the 1st Parachute Brigade, mainly elements of Lieutenant Colonel John Frost's 2nd Battalion, were able to reach the bridge. The 1st and 3rd Battalions were unable to penetrate the outer suburbs of the city and their advance stalled, so in order to support them the first lift of the South Stafford's were sent forward on the morning of 18 September. When the second lift arrived later that day they too were sent forward and arrived at the outskirts of Arnhem that night. The South Staffordshire's anti-tank platoon was kept in the divisional area.

In the early hours of the morning of 19 September, an attack was launched on a narrow front between the river and the railway line, in order to force a passage through to the bridge. Most of the support weapons were left in the rear, as they were unable to suitably deploy in the dark and in the narrow confines of the urban surroundings. However, in the face of strong enemy positions and armour, the attack faltered and the British were routed.

=== Withdrawal to Oosterbeek ===
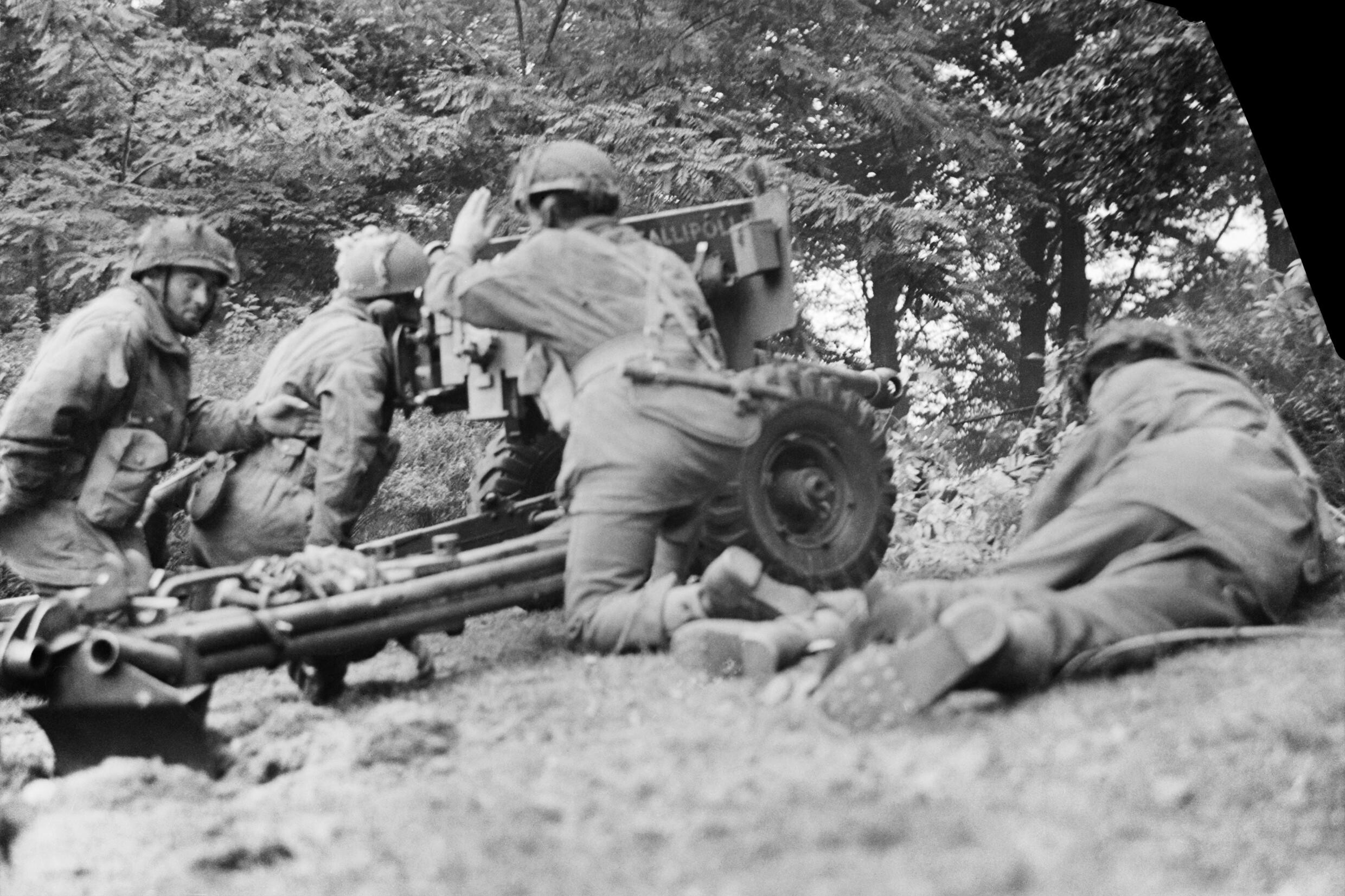
A 6 pounder anti–tank gun of the Border Regiment engages enemy armour on the western perimeter of Oosterbeek, on the same day as Baskeyfield's action.

The remnants of the four battalions fell back in disarray to the main divisional positions at Oosterbeek. Here they were gathered into defensive units by Lieutenant Colonel Sheriff Thompson, commanding officer of the 1st Airlanding Light Artillery Regiment, who forcibly stopped many of the panicked troops and had Major Robert Cain form them into a defensive screen half a mile in front of his own 75 mm howitzers positions. The sector was designated "Thompson Force", but Thompson actually sent Major Richard Lonsdale forward to take command of these outlying troops later in the day.

The German forces made determined attacks against Lonsdale's force on 20 September, starting soon after dawn. Baskeyfield was in charge of two 6 pounder anti–tank guns defending a T junction on the Benedendorpsweg, the southernmost road between Arnhem and Oosterbeek. Baskeyfield's guns faced up the Acacialaan, which joined the Benedendorpsweg from the north, and covered the likely enemy approach along this road and from open ground to the north east. His right flank – to the east – was covered by another anti-tank gun commanded by Lance-Sergeant Mansell.

In an initial German assault, Baskeyfield and his gun crews destroyed two tanks and a self-propelled gun as they advanced down the Acacialaan. Baskeyfield allowed the armour to come within 100 yards of his positions before ordering his crews to fire, while paratroopers of the 11th Battalion in nearby houses dealt with attacking infantry. In the course of this action, Baskeyfield's crew was killed or wounded and Baskeyfield himself was badly injured. However he refused to be evacuated and in a later German attack he worked his gun alone, loading, laying and firing it himself. He fired round after round until enemy fire put his gun out of action, and he crawled to the second gun, whose crew had similarly been disabled. From here he engaged another self-propelled gun, dispatching it with two rounds, but was killed shortly afterwards by fire from another German tank.

Lonsdale's men fell back to new positions later that day and "Thompson Force" was renamed "Lonsdale Force" when Thompson was wounded on 21 September. The force continued to hold the Oosterbeek perimeter until the Allies withdrew in Operation Berlin on the night of 25 September.

=== Victoria Cross ===
A Victoria Cross

The full citation for Baskeyfield's Victoria Cross appeared in a supplement to The London Gazette on 23 November 1944, reading:

War Office, 23rd November, 1944.

The KING has been graciously pleased to approve the posthumous award of the VICTORIA CROSS to: –

No. 5057916 Lance-Sergeant John Daniel Baskeyfield, The South Staffordshire- Regiment (1st Airborne Division) (Stoke-on-Trent).

On 20 September 1944, during the battle of Arnhem, Lance-Sergeant Baskeyfield was the N.C.O. in charge of a 6-pounder anti-tank gun at Oosterbeek. The enemy developed a major attack on this sector with infantry, tanks and self-propelled guns with the obvious intent to break into and overrun the Battalion position. During the early stage of the action the crew commanded by this N.C.O. was responsible for the destruction of two Tiger tanks and at least one self propelled gun, thanks to the coolness and daring of this N.C.O., who, with complete disregard for his own safety, allowed each tank to come well within 100 yards of his gun before opening fire.

In the course of this preliminary engagement Lance-Sergeant Baskeyfield was badly wounded in the leg and the remainder of his crew were either killed or badly wounded. During the brief respite after this engagement Lance-Sergeant Baskeyfield refused to be carried to the Regimental Aid Post and spent his time attending to his gun and shouting encouragement to his comrades in neighbouring trenches.

After a short interval the enemy renewed the attack with even greater ferocity than before, under cover of intense mortar and shell fire. Manning his gun quite alone Lance-Sergeant Baskeyfield continued to fire round after round at the enemy until his gun was put out of action. By this time his activity was the main factor in keeping the enemy tanks at bay. The fact that the surviving men in his vicinity were held together and kept in action was undoubtedly due to his magnificent example and outstanding courage. Time after time enemy attacks were launched and driven off. Finally, when his gun was knocked out, Lance-Sergeant Baskeyfield crawled under intense enemy fire to another 6-pounder gun nearby, the crew of which had been killed, and proceeded to man it single-handed. With this gun he engaged an enemy self propelled gun which was approaching to attack. Another soldier crawled across the open ground to assist him but was killed almost at once. Lance-Sergeant Baskeyfield succeeded in firing two rounds at the self propelled gun, scoring one direct hit which rendered it ineffective. Whilst preparing to fire a third shot, however, he was killed by a shell from a supporting enemy tank.

The superb gallantry of this N.C.O. is beyond praise. During the remaining days at Arnhem stories of his valour were a constant inspiration to all ranks. He spurned danger, ignored pain and, by his supreme fighting spirit, infected all who witnessed his conduct with the same aggressiveness and dogged devotion to duty which characterised his actions throughout.

== Legacy ==
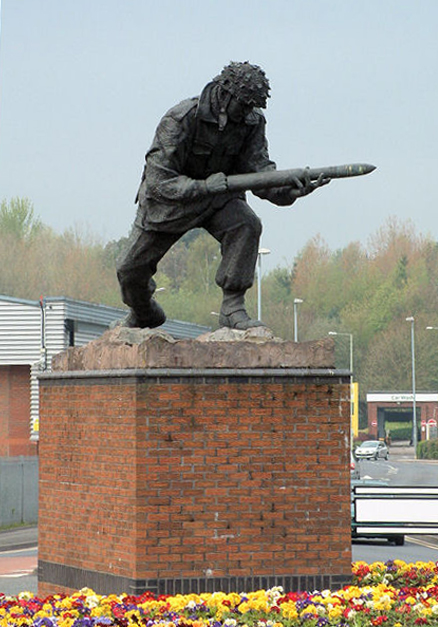
The memorial statue at Festival Heights in Stoke-on-Trent

After Arnhem was liberated in April 1945, Grave Registration Units of the British 2nd Army moved into the area and began to locate the Allied dead. Over 1700 men were buried in the Arnhem Oosterbeek War Cemetery, but Baskeyfield's body was never identified. Although several hundred burials in the cemetery are unidentified, there are no records of any unidentified soldiers being exhumed from Acacialaan. Instead Baskeyfield's name is inscribed on the Groesbeek Memorial which commemorates all those Allied servicemen killed between August 1944 and the end of the conflict who have no known grave. Four more VCs were awarded after the battle, including one for Major Robert Cain, commander of B Company, 2nd Battalion, South Staffordshire Regiment. The 2nd Battalion thus became the only British battalion to receive two VCs during one engagement in the Second World War.

His Victoria Cross is displayed at the Staffordshire Regiment Museum in Whittington, Staffordshire. A twice life size memorial statue of him was erected in 1990 at Festival Heights in Stoke-on-Trent, by sculptors Steven Whyte and Michael Talbot. The John Baskeyfield V.C. Church of England Primary School in Burslem was named after him but was renamed Saint Nathaniel's Academy on 1 March 2014. Baskeyfield is commemorated by the retirement community at Baskeyfield House, Angels Way, Burslem, built in 2015, and by the Army Reserve Centre, also called Baskeyfield House, at Anchor Road, Stoke-on-Trent. The artist Terence Cuneo made a painting of Baskeyfield's action, and in 1969 a Staffordshire filmmaker spent three years making a short film about his role in the battle, entitled Baskeyfield VC. A tree on the site of Baskeyfield's second gun, on the corner of Benedendorpsweg and Acacialaan, has been named the Jack Baskeyfield Tree.

== See also ==
- List of Second World War Victoria Cross recipients

Four other men were awarded the Victoria Cross at Arnhem:

- Major Robert Henry Cain, 2nd Battalion South Staffordshire Regiment.
- Lieutenant John Hollington Grayburn, 2nd Battalion Parachute Regiment.
- Flight Lieutenant David Samuel Anthony Lord, 271 Squadron, Royal Air Force.
- Captain Lionel Ernest Queripel, 10th Battalion Parachute Regiment.

== Bibliography ==
- Kershaw, Robert (1990). It Never Snows in September. Ian Allan Publishing. ISBN 0-7110-2167-8.
- Middlebrook, Martin (1995). Arnhem 1944: The Airborne Battle. Penguin. ISBN 0-14-014342-4.
- Steer, Frank (2003). Battleground Europe – Market Garden. Arnhem – The Bridge. Leo Cooper. ISBN 0-85052-939-5.
- Waddy, John (1999). A Tour of the Arnhem Battlefields. Pen & Sword Books Limited. ISBN 0-85052-571-3.
