= David Lord (RAF officer) =

Recipient of the Victoria Cross

David Lord VC DFC
- Born: 18 October 1913; Cork, Ireland
- Died: 19 September 1944 (aged 30); Arnhem, Netherlands
- Burial place: Arnhem Oosterbeek War Cemetery
- Military career
- Allegiance: United Kingdom
- Branch: Royal Air Force
- Service years: 1936–1944 †
- Rank: Flight lieutenant
- Conflicts: Second World War: North African Campaign; Pacific War; Western Front; Operation Market Garden; Battle of Arnhem †
- Awards: Victoria Cross; Distinguished Flying Cross; Mentioned in Despatches

David Samuel Anthony Lord, VC, DFC (18 October 1913 – 19 September 1944) was a recipient of the Victoria Cross, the highest award for gallantry in the face of the enemy that can be awarded to British and Commonwealth forces. A transport pilot in the Royal Air Force, Lord received the award posthumously for his actions during the Battle of Arnhem while flying resupply missions in support of British paratroops.

== Early life ==
David Lord was born on 18 October 1913 in Cork, Ireland, one of three sons of Samuel Beswick Lord (a warrant officer in the Royal Welsh Fusiliers) and Mary Ellen Lord (née Miller). One of Lord's brothers died in infancy.

After the First World War the family were posted to British India and Lord attended Lucknow Convent School. On his father's retirement from the Army the family moved to Wales where they settled in Wrexham, then David was a pupil at St Mary's College, Aberystwyth, and then the University of Wales. Later, he attended the English College, Valladolid, Spain, to study for the Roman Catholic priesthood. Deciding that it was not the career for him, he returned to Wrexham, before moving to London in the mid-1930s to work as a freelance writer.

== Second World War ==
Lord enlisted in the Royal Air Force on 6 August 1936. After reaching the rank of corporal in August 1938, he applied to undertake pilot training, which he began in October 1938. Successfully gaining his pilot's wings, he became a sergeant pilot in April 1939, and was posted to No. 31 Squadron RAF, based in Lahore, India. He later flew the Vickers Valentia biplane transport. In 1941, No. 31 Squadron was the first unit to receive the Douglas DC-2, followed later by the Douglas DC-3 and Dakota transports. That year he was promoted to flight sergeant and then warrant officer. He flew in North Africa, supporting troops in Libya and Egypt for four months, before being posted back to India. Commissioned as a pilot officer in May 1942, he flew supply missions over Burma, for which he was mentioned in despatches.

Lord was awarded the Distinguished Flying Cross in July 1943, receiving the award at Buckingham Palace, and was promoted to flight lieutenant shortly afterwards. By January 1944, he had joined No. 271 Squadron (based at RAF Down Ampney, Gloucestershire) and began training as part of preparations for the invasion of Europe. On D-Day, Lord carried paratroopers into France and his aircraft was hit by flak, returning to base without flaps.

=== Battle of Arnhem ===
The Battle of Arnhem was part of Operation Market Garden, an attempt to secure a string of bridges through the Netherlands. At Arnhem, the British 1st Airborne Division and Polish 1st Independent Parachute Brigade were tasked with securing bridges across the Lower Rhine, the final objectives of the operation. However, the airborne forces that dropped on 17 September were not aware that the 9th SS and 10th SS Panzer divisions were also near Arnhem for rest and refit. Their presence added a substantial number of Panzergrenadiers, tanks and self-propelled guns to the German defences and the Allies suffered heavily in the ensuing battle. Only a small force managed to hold one end of the Arnhem road bridge before being overrun on 21 September. The rest of the division became trapped in a small pocket west of the bridge and had to be evacuated on 25 September. The Allies failed to cross the Rhine, which remained under German control until Allied offensives in March 1945.

=== Resupply flights ===
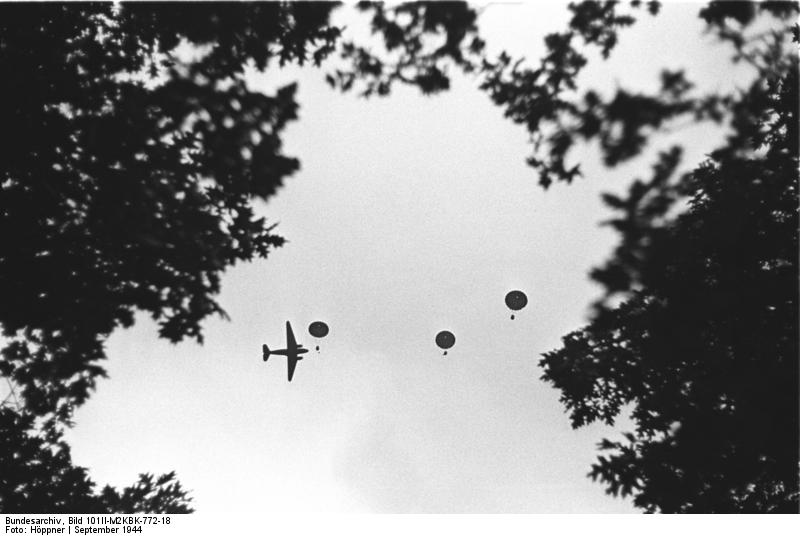
A German photograph of a supply drop over Arnhem

Lord was 30 years old, and a flight lieutenant serving with No. 271 Squadron, Royal Air Force during the Second World War when he was awarded the Victoria Cross. On 19 September 1944, during the Battle of Arnhem in the Netherlands, the British 1st Airborne Division was in desperate need of supplies. Lord's Douglas Dakota III "KG374" encountered intense enemy anti-aircraft fire and was twice hit, with one engine burning. Lord managed to drop his supplies, but at the end of the run found that there were two containers remaining. Although he knew that one of his wings might collapse at any moment, he nevertheless made a second run to drop the last supplies, then ordered his crew to bail out. A few seconds later, the Dakota crashed in flames with its pilot and six crew members.

Only the navigator, Flying Officer Harold King, survived, becoming a prisoner of war. It was only on his release in mid-1945, as well as the release of several paratroops from the 10th Parachute Battalion, that the story of Lord's action became known. Lord was awarded a posthumous Victoria Cross.

== Victoria Cross citation ==
A Victoria Cross

The full citation for Lord's VC appeared in a supplement to The London Gazette on 9 November 1945, reading:

Air Ministry, 13 November 1945.

The KING has been graciously pleased to confer the VICTORIA CROSS on the undermentioned officer in recognition of most conspicuous bravery:—

Flight Lieutenant David Samuel Anthony LORD, D.F.C. (49149), R.A.F., 271 Sqn. (deceased).

Flight Lieutenant Lord was pilot and captain of a Dakota aircraft detailed to drop supplies at Arnhem on the afternoon of 19 September 1944. Our airborne troops had been surrounded and were being pressed into a small area defended by a large number of anti-aircraft guns. Air crews were warned that intense opposition would be met over the dropping zone. To ensure accuracy they were ordered to fly at 900 feet when dropping their containers.

While flying at 1,500 feet near Arnhem the starboard wing of Flight Lieutenant Lord's aircraft was twice hit by anti-aircraft fire. The starboard engine was set on fire. He would have been justified in leaving the main stream of supply aircraft and continuing at the same height or even abandoning his aircraft. But on learning that his crew were uninjured and that the dropping zone would be reached in three minutes he said he would complete his mission, as the troops were in dire need of supplies.

By now the starboard engine was burning furiously. Flight Lieutenant Lord came down to 900 feet, where he was singled out for the concentrated fire of all the anti-aircraft guns. On reaching the dropping zone he kept the aircraft on a straight, and level course while supplies were dropped. At the end of the run, he was told that two containers remained.

Although he must have known that the collapse of the starboard wing could not be long delayed, Flight Lieutenant Lord circled, rejoined the stream of aircraft and made a second run to drop the remaining supplies. These manoeuvres took eight minutes in all, the aircraft being continuously under heavy anti-aircraft fire.

His task completed, Flight Lieutenant Lord ordered his crew to abandon the Dakota, making no attempt himself to leave the aircraft, which was down to 500 feet. A few seconds later, the starboard wing collapsed and the aircraft fell in flames. There was only one survivor, who was flung out while assisting other members of the crew to put on their parachutes.

By continuing his mission in a damaged and burning aircraft, descending to drop the supplies accurately, returning to the dropping zone a second time and, finally, remaining at the controls to give his crew a chance of escape, Flight Lieutenant Lord displayed supreme valour and self-sacrifice.

== Legacy ==
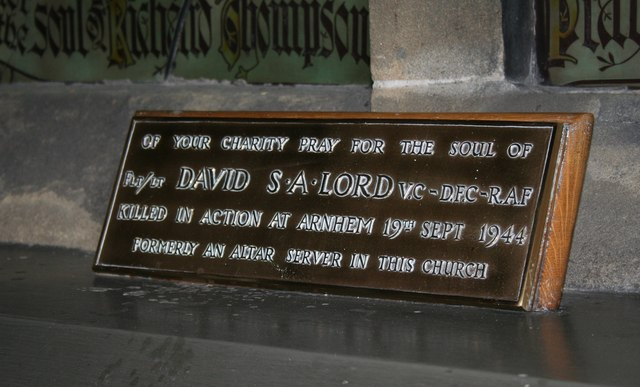
The memorial to Lord at Wrexham Cathedral

After Arnhem was liberated in April 1945, Grave Registration Units of the British 2nd Army moved into the area and began to locate the Allied dead. Lord was buried alongside his crew in the Arnhem Oosterbeek War Cemetery. There are many plaques in memory of him, including one at Wrexham Cathedral in Wales.

Several aircraft have carried tributes to Lord. Between 1993 and 1998, the RAF Battle of Britain Memorial Flight's Dakota, serial "ZA947", was painted in the colours of Lord's aircraft during the Arnhem battle, and bore the same code letters: YS-DM. Between 1973 and 2005, the Dakota displayed at Royal Air Force Museum Midlands, Cosford was similarly painted and coded to represent Lord's aircraft. From 1966 until its disbandment in 2005, No. 10 Squadron RAF was equipped with Vickers VC-10s, each of which was named after a Royal Air Force or Royal Flying Corps VC recipient. Aircraft serial number 'XR810' was named David Lord VC.

Lord's Victoria Cross was presented to his parents at Buckingham Palace in December 1945. In 1997, Lord's VC, along with his other decorations and medals, were sold at auction by Spinks to Lord Ashcroft. As of 2014, the medal group was on display at the Imperial War Museum.

== See also ==
Four other men were awarded the Victoria Cross at Arnhem:

- Major Robert Henry Cain, 2nd Battalion, South Staffordshire Regiment.
- Lance-Sergeant John Daniel Baskeyfield, 2nd Battalion, South Staffordshire Regiment.
- Lieutenant John Hollington Grayburn, 2nd Battalion, Parachute Regiment.
- Captain Lionel Ernest Queripel, 10th Battalion, Parachute Regiment.

== Bibliography ==
- Ashcroft, Michael (2007) [2006]. Victoria Cross Heroes. Headline Review. ISBN 978-0-7553-1633-5.
- Kershaw, Robert (1990). It Never Snows in September. Ian Allan Publishing. ISBN 0-7110-2167-8.
- Middlebrook, Martin (1994). Arnhem 1944: The Airborne Battle. Viking. ISBN 0-670-83546-3.
- Waddy, John (1999). A Tour of the Arnhem Battlefields. Pen & Sword Books Limited. ISBN 0-85052-571-3.
