= Parachute Regiment and Airborne Forces Museum =

Airborne Assault

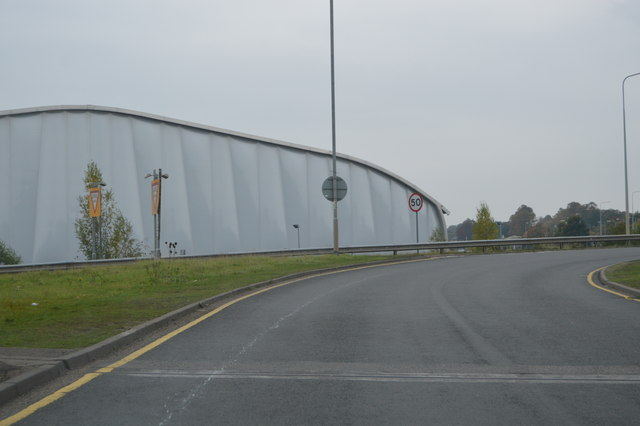
- The Airborne Assault Hangar at Duxford

- Shown in Cambridgeshire
- Established: 1946
- Coordinates: 52.095644°N 0.133284°E
- Type: Regimental museum
- Public transit access: Stagecoach C7 from Cambridge.
- Website: www.paradata.org.uk

Airborne Assault – The Museum of the Parachute Regiment and Airborne Forces is based at Duxford in Cambridgeshire and tells the story of the Parachute Regiment and other airborne forces.

== History ==
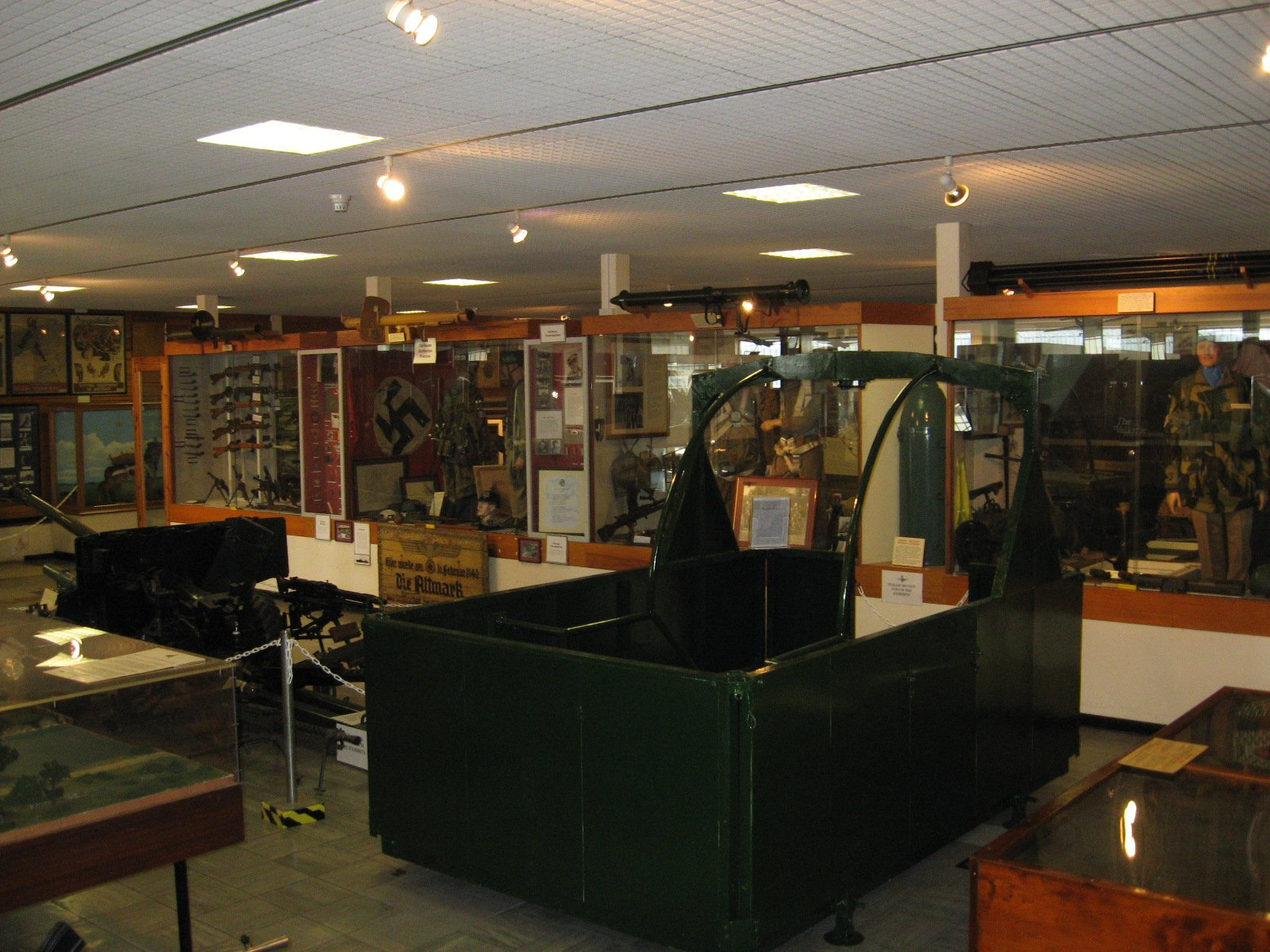
Interior of the former museum at Aldershot (October 2007)

The museum was established by a meeting of the Committee of the Parachute Regiment Association in October 1946. It was housed in various barracks until a permanent home at Browning Barracks at the Aldershot Garrison was opened by Field Marshal Lord Montgomery on 23 March 1969. The museum moved to a new home in partnership with Imperial War Museum Duxford under the Airborne Assault name in late 2008. The new exhibition at Duxford was opened by Charles, Prince of Wales (now King Charles III), Colonel-in-Chief of The Parachute Regiment on 8 December 2008.

== The exhibits ==
New multimedia displays tell the story of today's airborne soldier and his heritage from 1940 when British Airborne Forces were first formed at the insistence of Prime Minister Winston Churchill. The displays include the original briefing models for airborne operations of World War II, including the Bruneval Raid, D-Day and the Rhine Crossing. The phases of the battle of Arnhem and Operation Market Garden are fully explained in a dedicated exhibit. Broad coverage is given to the post-war campaigns from Borneo and Suez to the Falklands War, Northern Ireland and Afghanistan. Exhibits of light weapons and heavy drop equipment from jeeps to field guns are suspended as if dropping into action. An original nosecone of the Horsa glider which carried airlanding troops into action at Normandy and the Rhine is featured, as well as the stuffed Bing the Paradog, who dropped in 1945.

== Medal Gallery ==
The Medal Gallery exhibits many of the medals awarded to British airborne troops, including the posthumous VCs awarded to Lt. John Hollington Grayburn of the 2nd Battalion the Parachute Regiment, Captain Lionel Ernest Queripel of the 10th Battalion the Parachute Regiment, and that awarded in 2007 to Corporal Bryan Budd, of the 3rd Battalion.

== The ParaData resource ==
The vision for Airborne Assault is a unique attraction bringing alive the history and modern reality of the Parachute Regiment and Airborne Forces. Central to this is ParaData – a comprehensive database record of all who have served, and are currently serving, linked to accounts and details of relevant campaigns and engagements. Photographs, documents, letters and film and audio interviews are appended to each entry where available, and contributions of further material are invited. The database aims to be a definitive history and a continually updated resource. While paying respect to those who have served and their families, this will engage a younger audience, especially with reference to the National Curriculum, through the use of the latest technology.

== Gallery ==
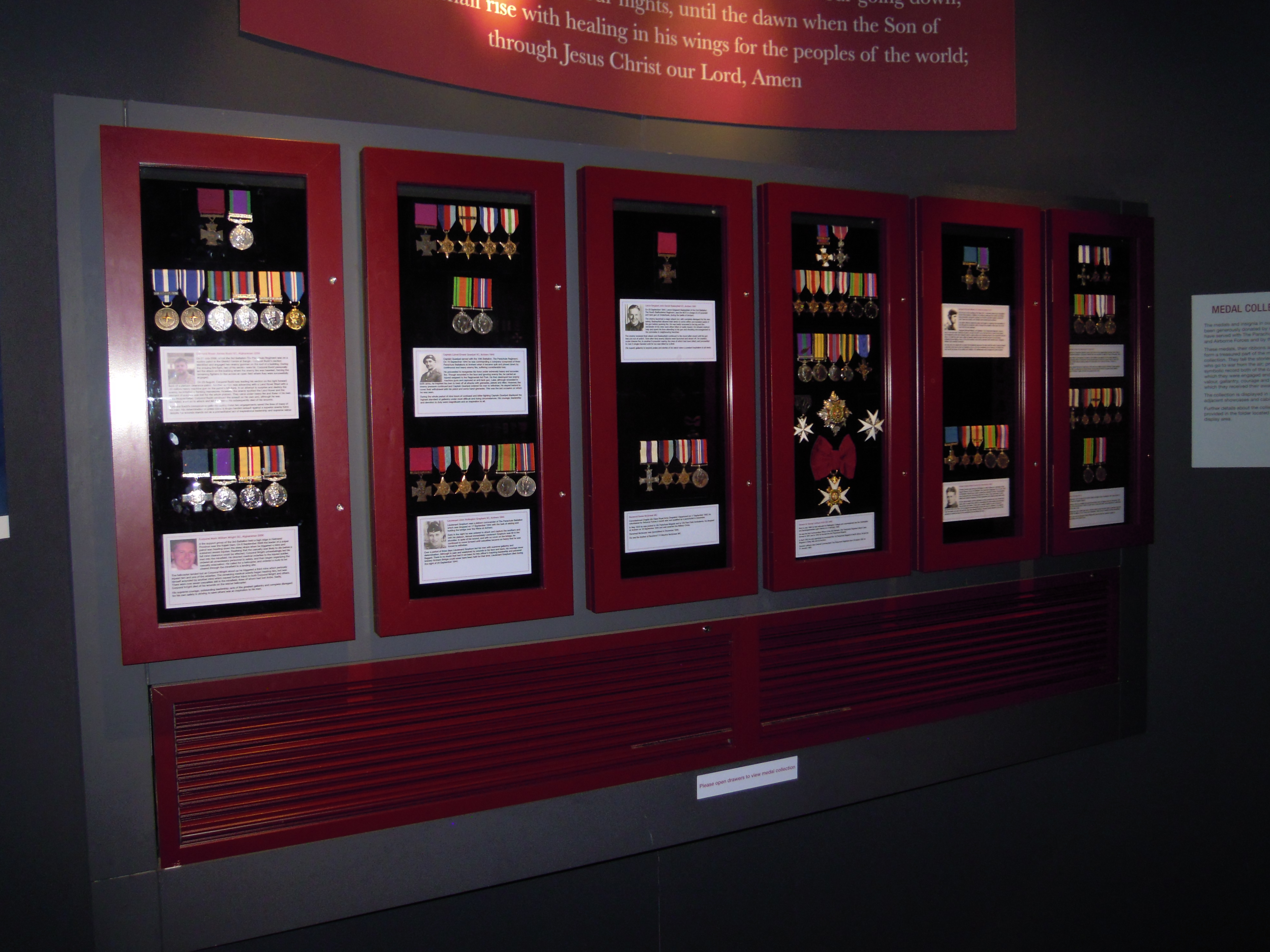
Section of the Medal Gallery

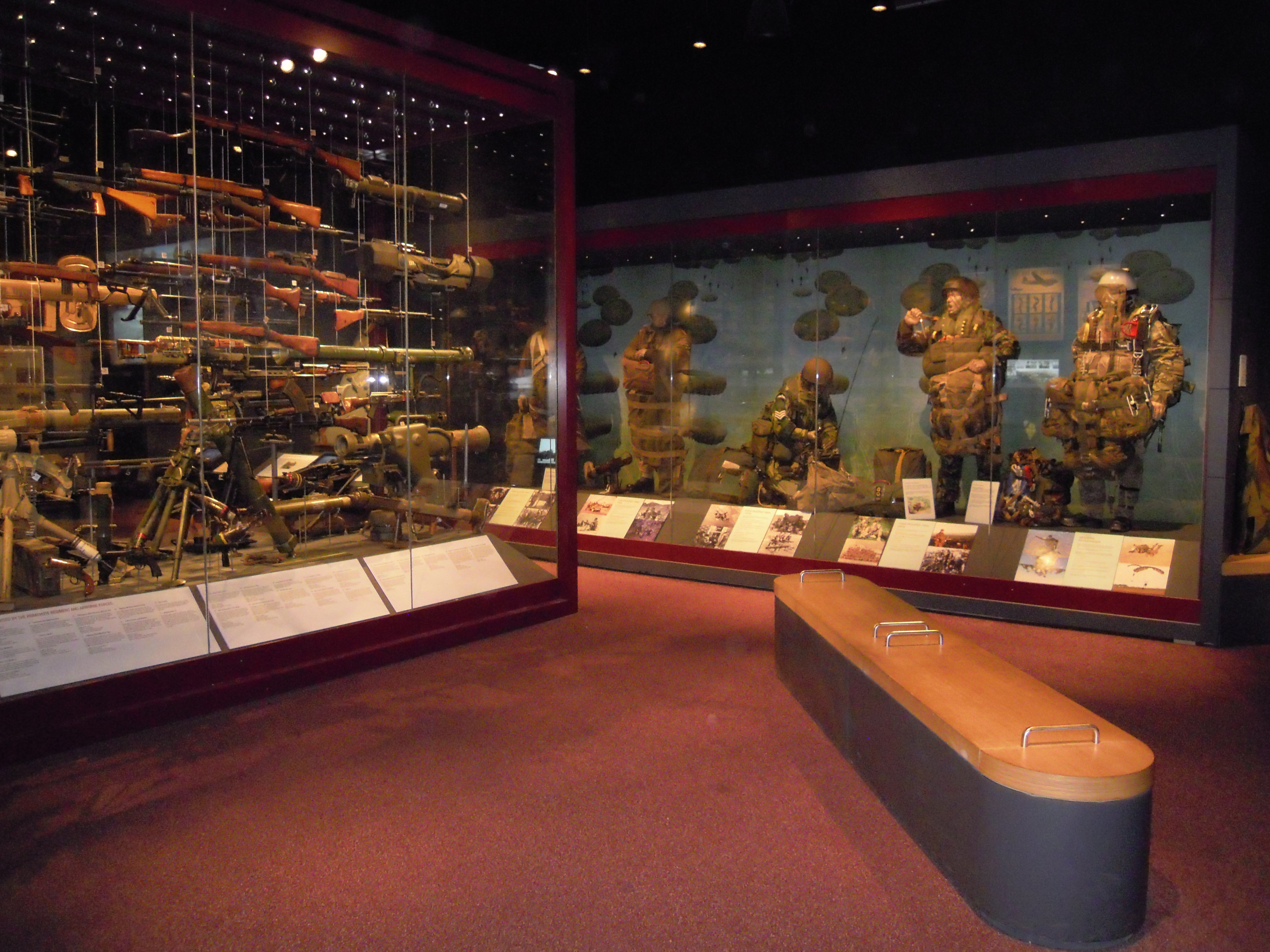
Display of weapons and uniforms

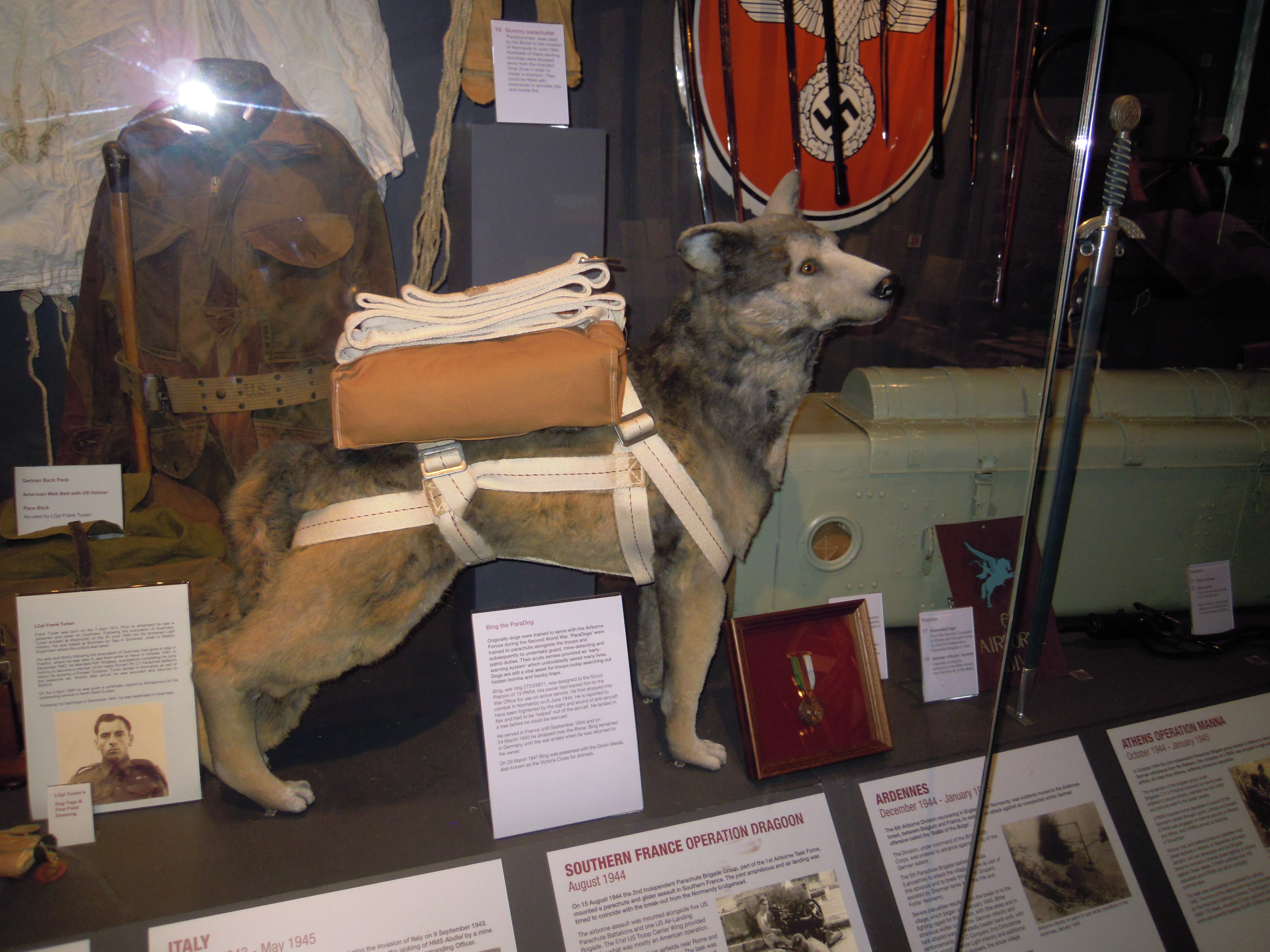
Bing the ParaDog displayed with his Dickin Medal

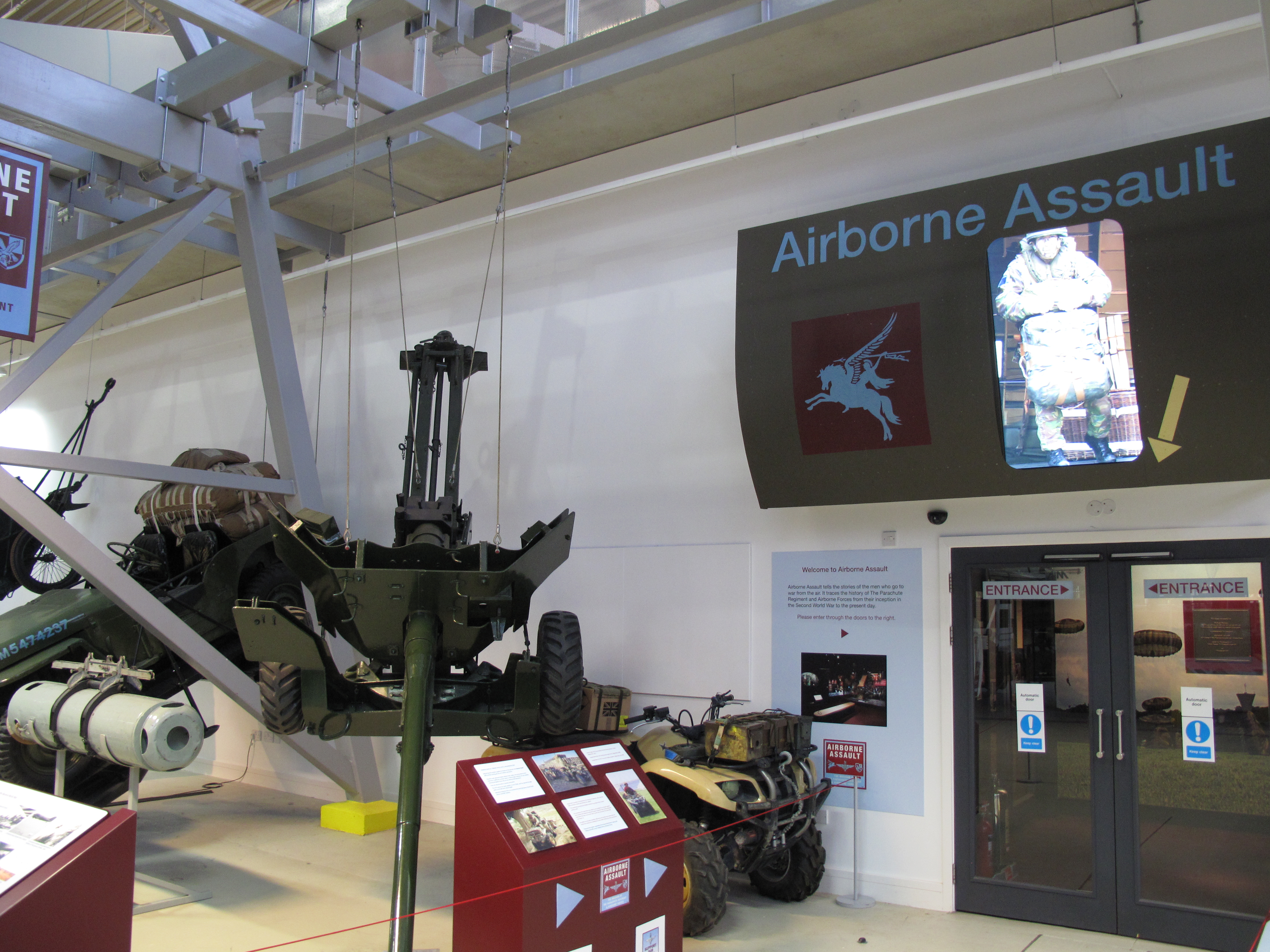
Airborne Assault entrance

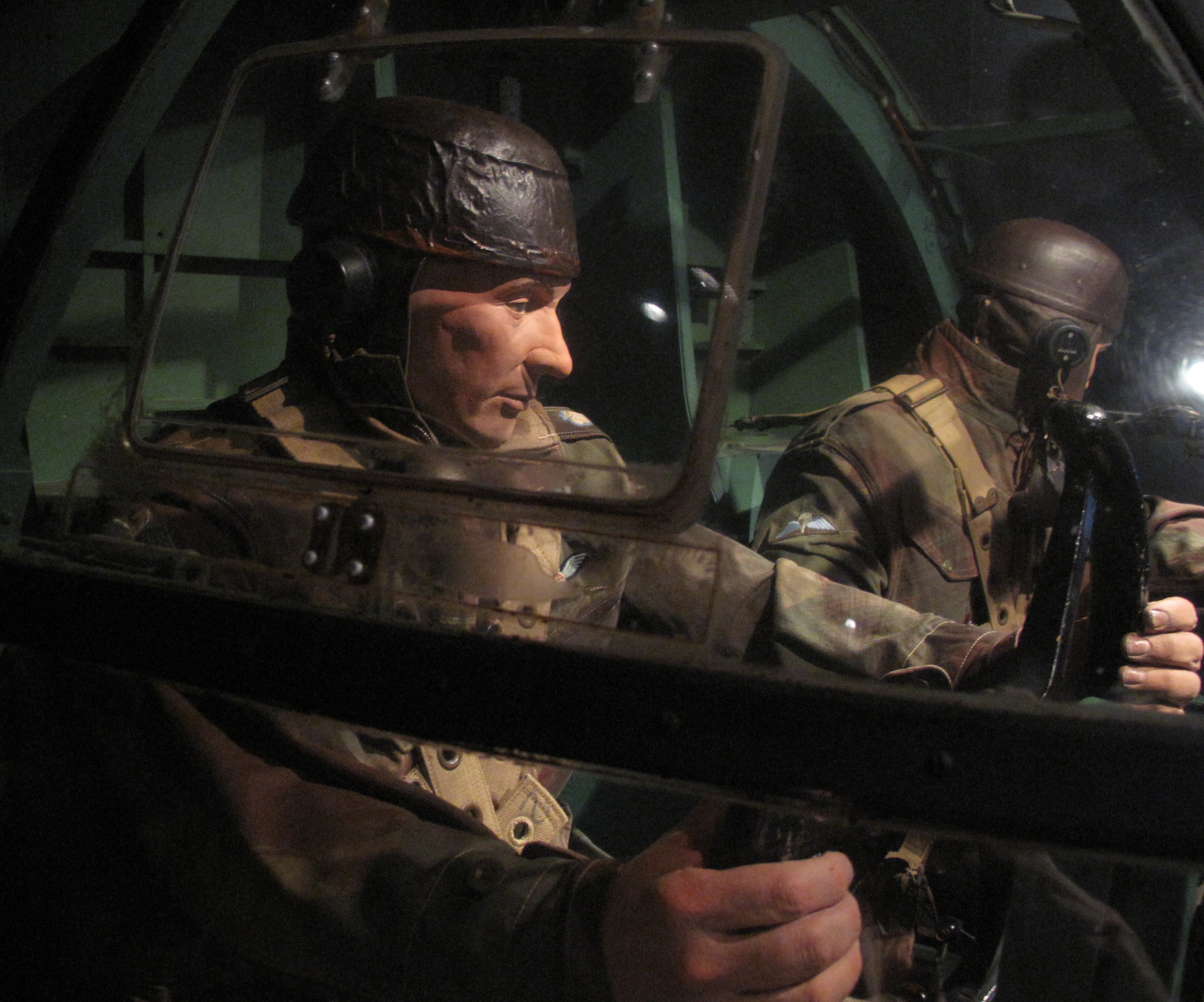
Glider Pilot Display
