= Lance sergeant =

Military rank in the United Kingdom and Commonwealth

Lance sergeant (LSgt or L/Sgt) is a military appointment in the armies of the Commonwealth and formerly also a rank in the United States Army.

== Commonwealth ==
Lance-sergeant in the armies of the Commonwealth was an appointment given to a corporal so they could fill a post usually held by a sergeant. The appointment is retained now currently only in the Foot Guards and Honourable Artillery Company in the British Army.

Lance sergeant
- British Army/Foot Guards insignia
- Country: United Kingdom
- Service branch: British Army
- Abbreviation: LSgt; L/Sgt
- Rank group: Non-commissioned officer
- NATO rank code: OR-4
- Next higher rank: Sergeant
- Next lower rank: Corporal

=== United Kingdom ===
In these regiments today, all corporals are automatically appointed lance sergeant on their promotion, so lance sergeants perform the same duties as corporals in other regiments and are not acting in place of sergeants. The Household Cavalry equivalent is lance-corporal of horse.

The appointment originated in the British Army and Royal Marines, in which it could be removed by the soldier's commanding officer, unlike a full sergeant, who could only be demoted by court martial. Lance-sergeants may have first appeared in the 19th century, (Note: The earliest mentions of the appointment in the London Gazette and The Times are actually in connection with the Royal Marines in 1840.) although they are mentioned in the late-18th century military essay "The Elements of Military Arrangement" (John Williamson, 1781):

"When from sickness or other causes there are not in a company a sufficient number of non-commission officers to do the duty, the captain can appoint corporals to do the duty of serjeants, who are called lance serjeants, and private men to do the duty of corporals, who are called lance corporals."

The appointment was abolished in most regiments and corps in 1946. Some cadet units also retained the rank in addition to corporal into at least the 1980s.

Lance sergeants wear three rank chevrons, the same insignia as a sergeant. In full dress, Foot Guards lance sergeants are distinguished from full sergeants by their white chevrons (full sergeants wearing gold); and in working dress, primarily by wearing an other ranks cap badge instead of a senior NCO variant.

Some sources claim that the use of the appointment of lance-sergeant was introduced by Queen Victoria, who stated that her guards would not wear only one chevron when mounting guard outside the royal palaces. Guards lance-corporals therefore wore (and still wear) two chevrons. That left the problem of what the full corporal would wear, so the appointment of lance-sergeant was introduced. However, the Guards regiments still had corporals until after the First World War and the appointment of lance-sergeant was used throughout the army (not just by the Guards) until 1946, so the veracity of the story is questionable.

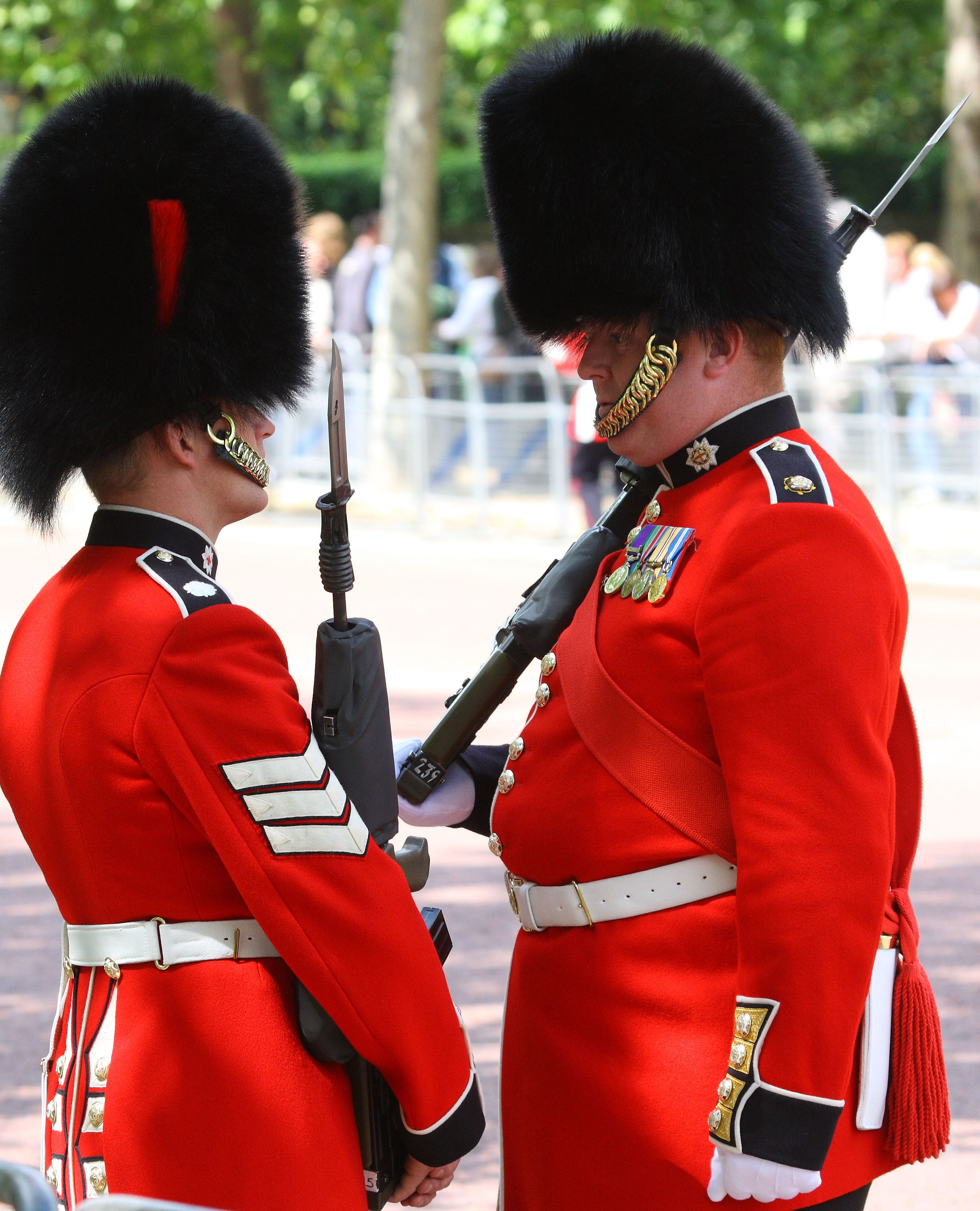
A lance sergeant (left) of the Coldstream Guards is addressed by one of the regiment's colour sergeants.

=== Canada ===
Prior to 1968, Lance Sergeant was an appointment in the Canadian Army. Much like his counterpart in the British Army, a soldier holding the rank of Corporal could be appointed a Lance Sergeant. He would receive the pay of a Corporal, but wore the rank insignia of a "full" Sergeant and was permitted to belong to the Warrant Officers' and Sergeants' Mess. Also in common with the appointment of Lance Corporal, the appointment could also be removed by the Commanding Officer at any time without administrative action (i.e. a court marshal); unlike in the case of a substantive sergeant.

Following Unification, both the appointments of Lance Sergeant and Lance Corporal were abolished.

In the current Canadian Army, a corporal may be given the appointment of master corporal. This appointment functions similarly to that of a lance sergeant in that the appointee may occupy a position normally held by a sergeant, such as a section commander or platoon second-in-command.

== United States ==
The rank of lance sergeant existed in the U.S. Army from at least 1841 until sometime between 1901 and 1904. The rank of lance sergeant, like that of lance corporal, was a temporary rank to which a private or corporal could be appointed in an as needed capacity. The holder of the appointment held the same rank, authority, and responsibility of a regular sergeant (or corporal), but was still only paid as a corporal (or private). If this temporary duty was performed to a high standard, the holder of the rank could be considered for promotion to permanent rank if a vacancy became available. The first official documentation for the rank appears in General Regulations for the Army of the United States (Article XVI, Paragraph 64), published on 25 January 1841. The last recorded reference to the lance sergeant rank was in Regulations for the Army of the United States 1895, With Appendix Separately Indexed and Showing Changes to January 1, 1901 (Article XXXII, Paragraph 257). In Regulations for the Army of the United States 1904, the rank of lance sergeant does not appear and it does not appear in further iterations of U.S. Army regulations. (Note: None of the referenced regulations provide any information pertaining to the prerequisites for appointment to lance sergeant, or the rank insignia, manning authorisation, duties, responsibilities, or authority of the lance sergeant.)
