= Lionel Queripel =

Recipient of the Victoria Cross

Lionel Ernest Queripel VC
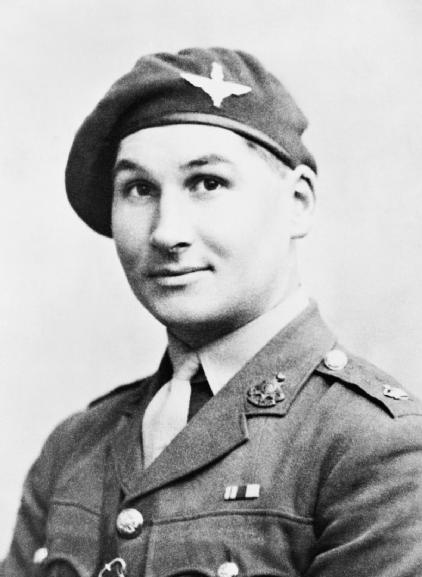
- Born: 13 July 1920; Winterborne Monkton, Dorset, England
- Died: 19 September 1944 (aged 24); Wolfheze, German-occupied Netherlands
- Burial place: Arnhem Oosterbeek War Cemetery, Netherlands
- Military career
- Allegiance: United Kingdom
- Branch: British Army
- Service years: 1939−1944 †
- Rank: Captain
- Service number: 108181
- Units: Royal Sussex Regiment; Parachute Regiment
- Conflicts: World War II
- Awards: Victoria Cross

Captain Lionel Ernest Queripel VC (13 July 1920 − 19 September 1944) was a British Army officer and an English recipient of the Victoria Cross (VC), the highest and most prestigious award for gallantry in the face of the enemy that can be awarded to British and Commonwealth forces.

== Early life ==
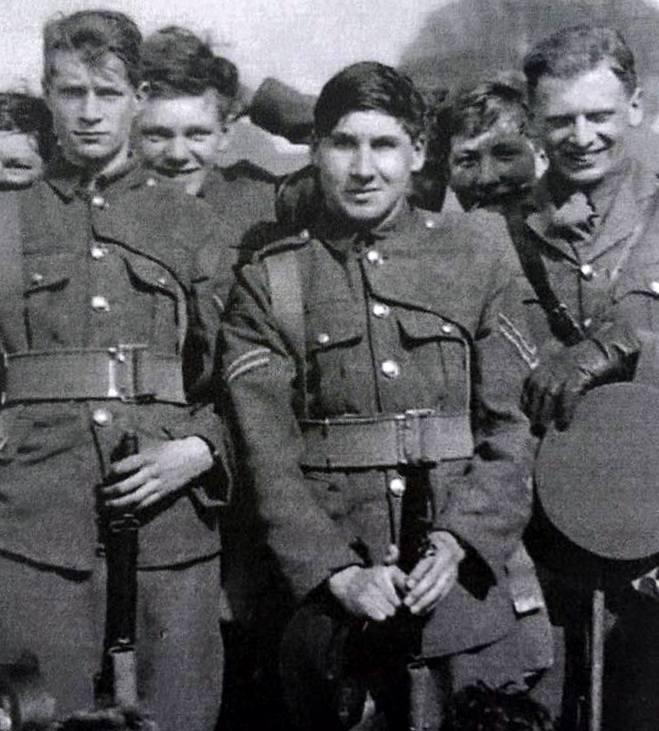
Queripel at Marlborough, presumably sometime in the late 1930s.

Lionel Queripel came from a well established and highly decorated military family; his father, Colonel L. H. Queripel, was appointed CMG and awarded the DSO, having served during the Boxer Rebellion in 1900 and later in Mesopotamia, France and Russia during World War I. His grandfather (appointed CB) and great-grandfather were also soldiers. He was born in Winterborne Monkton, Dorset, England. He was educated at Marlborough College.

== World War II ==
Queripel, intent on pursuing a military career, entered the Royal Military College, Sandhurst in January 1939. On 22 October, just a few weeks after the outbreak of World War II, he was commissioned as a second lieutenant into the Royal Sussex Regiment. He was posted to the regiment's 2nd Battalion, a Regular Army unit then commanded by Lieutenant Colonel Manley James, a Victoria Cross (VC) recipient of World War I. The battalion was serving in Northern Ireland on internal security duties before moving to England in December where it became part of the 133rd Infantry Brigade, itself one of three brigades forming Major General Edmund Osborne's 44th (Home Counties) Infantry Division. Together with the rest of his battalion, Queripel went to France in April 1940, only to return less than two months later, after the British Expeditionary Force (BEF), despite fighting bravely in the Battle of France, was forced to retreat to Dunkirk, from where they were evacuated to England. Almost two years of home defence, spent mainly in Kent, were to pass before Queripel, who on 22 April 1941 was promoted to lieutenant, and his battalion were to see further action.

In May 1942 Queripel's battalion, along with the rest of the 44th Division, now under Major General Ivor Hughes, left England, destined for North Africa. On 27 July Queripel was promoted to the temporary rank of captain. After participating in the Battle of Alam el Halfa and the Second Battle of El Alamein (the latter where they sustained heavy casualties) the battalion was one of several to provide candidates for selection to form a new battalion of the Parachute Regiment. Originally, when the 2nd Battalion was scheduled for conversion it was known as ‘S’ Battalion. However, the War Office then decreed that a regular unit could not be transferred to the Army Air Corps and the battalion remained on strength bolstered by men of the 4th and 5th Battalions. There were 200 or so men of the 2nd Battalion who qualified and progressed to parachute training and they formed the basis of the 10th Parachute Battalion at Kabrit under Lieutenant Colonel Kenneth Smyth, of the South Wales Borderers. The battalion eventually became part of Brigadier John Hackett's 4th Parachute Brigade, which in June 1943 became part of Major General George Hopkinson's 1st Airborne Division. The 4th Para Brigade was held in reserve and unused during the Allied invasion of Sicily but participated in Operation Slapstick, part of the Allied invasion of Italy, in September 1943, and fought briefly in the early stages of the Italian Campaign before returning, with the rest of the division, to England in December 1943. As in Sicily, the division was held in reserve for the D-Day landings and unused during the subsequent Normandy Campaign, before being selected to take part in Operation Market Garden.

=== Battle of Arnhem ===
Queripel was 24 years old, and a Captain in the 10th Battalion, Parachute Regiment, 4th Parachute Brigade, 1st Airborne Division during this battle when the following deed took place for which he was awarded the Victoria Cross. By 1400 hrs on 19 September the confusion and heavy casualties saw Captain Queripel acting as commander of a company composed of the men of three parachute battalions. As they advanced along a main road on an embankment towards Arnhem they came under continuous machine-gun fire. At one point, the fire became so heavy that the company was split up on either side of the road and suffered considerable losses. Captain Queripel immediately began to reorganise his troops, crossing and recrossing the road while doing so, under extremely heavy and accurate fire from a strong point consisting of a captured British anti-tank gun and two machine guns. Whilst carrying a wounded sergeant to the regimental aid post under fire he was himself wounded in the face. Having reorganised his force, Captain Queripel personally led a party of men against the strong point holding up the advance. Despite the extremely heavy fire directed at him, Captain Queripel succeeded in killing the crews of the machine-guns and recapturing the anti-tank gun enabling the advance to continue. Later Captain Queripel was ordered to defend some woodland near the Wolfheze level crossing which was vital to the allied advance (Wolfheze is about 12 km to the northwest of Arnhem Bridge but only a few hundred metres from the Drop and Landing Zones used). By this time he had received further wounds in both arms, was cut off with a small party of men and took up a position in a ditch. Disregarding his injuries and the heavy mortar and machine gun fire, he continued to inspire his men to resist with hand grenades, pistols, and the few remaining rifles. On at least one occasion he picked up and threw back an enemy stick grenade which had landed in the ditch. As the enemy pressure increased, Captain Queripel decided that it was impossible to hold the position any longer and ordered the men to withdraw. Despite their protests, he insisted on remaining behind to cover their withdrawal with his automatic pistol and a few remaining hand grenades. This was the last occasion on which he was seen.

== Victoria Cross citation ==
The full citation for Queripel's Victoria Cross appeared in a supplement to The London Gazette on 1 February 1945, reading:

War Office, 1st February, 1945.

The KING has been graciously pleased to approve the award of the VICTORIA CROSS to:—

Captain Lionel Ernest Queripel (108181), The Royal Sussex Regiment. (1st Airborne Division) (Dorchester).

In Holland on the 19th September, 1944, Captain Queripel was acting as Company Commander of a composite Company composed of three Parachute Battalions.

At 14.00 hours on that day, his Company was advancing along a main road which ran on an embankment towards Arnhem. The advance was conducted under continuous medium machine-gun fire which, at one period, became so heavy that the Company became split up on either side of the road and suffered considerable losses. Captain Queripel at once proceeded to reorganise his force, crossing and recrossing the road whilst doing so, under extremely heavy and accurate fire. During this period he carried a wounded Sergeant to the Regimental Aid Post under fire and was himself wounded in the face.

Having reorganised his force, Captain Queripel personally led a party of men against the strong point holding up the advance. This strong point consisted of a captured British anti-tank gun and two machine-guns. Despite the extremely heavy fire directed at him, Captain Queripel succeeded in killing the crews of the machine-guns and recapturing the anti-tank gun. As a result of this, the advance was able to continue.

Later in the same day, Captain Queripel found himself cut off with a small party of men and took up a position in a ditch. By this time he had received further wounds in both arms. Regardless of his wounds and of the very heavy mortar and spandau fire, he continued to inspire his men to resist with hand grenades, pistols and the few remaining rifles.

As, however, the enemy pressure increased, Captain Queripel decided that it was impossible to hold the position any longer and ordered his men to withdraw. Despite their protests, he insisted on remaining behind to cover their withdrawal with his automatic pistol and a few remaining hand grenades. This is the last occasion on which he was seen.

During the whole of a period of nine hours of confused and bitter fighting Captain Queripel displayed the highest standard of gallantry under most difficult and trying circumstances. His courage, leadership and devotion to duty were magnificent, and an inspiration to all. This officer is officially reported to be wounded and missing.

== Legacy ==
Queripel is buried in the Arnhem Oosterbeek War Cemetery. Following the custom of the British Army, his gravestone is marked with the regimental badge of the regiment he was first commissioned into rather than that of his serving unit, The Parachute Regiment.

As is often the case with posthumous VC recipients, there are many Regimental memorials to Lionel Queripel, these include: the Parachute Regiment Roll of Honour which used to be in St Martins-in-the-Fields Church, London but is now in Aldershot; Queripel House the site of 10 PARA’s HQ at Duke of York’s in London; Leicestershire where 10 PARA emplaned; the Royal Sussex Book of Remembrance in Chichester Cathedral; the entrance porch to the village church at Somerby and of course the Airborne Forces Museum and the Royal Sussex museum at Duxford, Aldershot and Oosterbeek. Recently, Captain Queripel’s school, Marlborough College, has unveiled a VC/GC memorial on which his name is commemorated; it had already been commemorated on the walls of the school's Memorial Hall.

Recently his home town of Tunbridge Wells (to where the family moved in 1926) added his name to the Town War Memorial but he had already been included in a unique VC Memorial in Dunorlan Park in Tunbridge Wells. Ten VC recipients had lived in Tunbridge Wells including the very first VC to be awarded to Charles Lucas, who as a mate on HMS Hecla] during the Crimean War in 1854 picked a live shell with a burning fuse from the deck and threw it overboard.

In February 1945 when the award of the Victoria Cross was announced, Tunbridge Wells Council commissioned a poem by Herbert Hope Campbell. At the time Lionel Queripel was posted as missing, it was not until after the war that it was confirmed he was killed:

We who are burghers of your native town

Hail you today with your illustrious name,
Your knightly valour wins for you renown;
We glory in your courage and your fame!
May we be worthy of your daring deed

Performed by you in England’s hour of need.

On 19 September 2007, Lionel Queripel's sword, which had been held with B Coy the London Regiment, was presented to the Royal Sussex Regiment Museum in Eastbourne. His surviving sister, her family and Regimental representatives were present. His Victoria Cross is displayed at the Parachute Regiment and Airborne Forces Museum.

== Bibliography ==
- Beaton, David (2005). Dorset's Forgotten Heroes. Dovecote Press. ISBN 1-874336-99-7.
- John, Laffin (1997). British VCs of World War 2: A Study in Heroism. Sutton Publishing. ISBN 0-7509-1026-7.
- Ingleton, Roy (2011). Kent VCs. Pen and Sword Books. ISBN 978-1848844094.
- Buzzell, Nora, ed. (1997). The Register of the Victoria Cross. Cheltenham, Gloucestershire: This England Alma House. ISBN 0-906324-27-0.
