= Jonkerbos War Cemetery =

WWII CWGC cemetery in Netherlands

- Commonwealth War Graves Commission
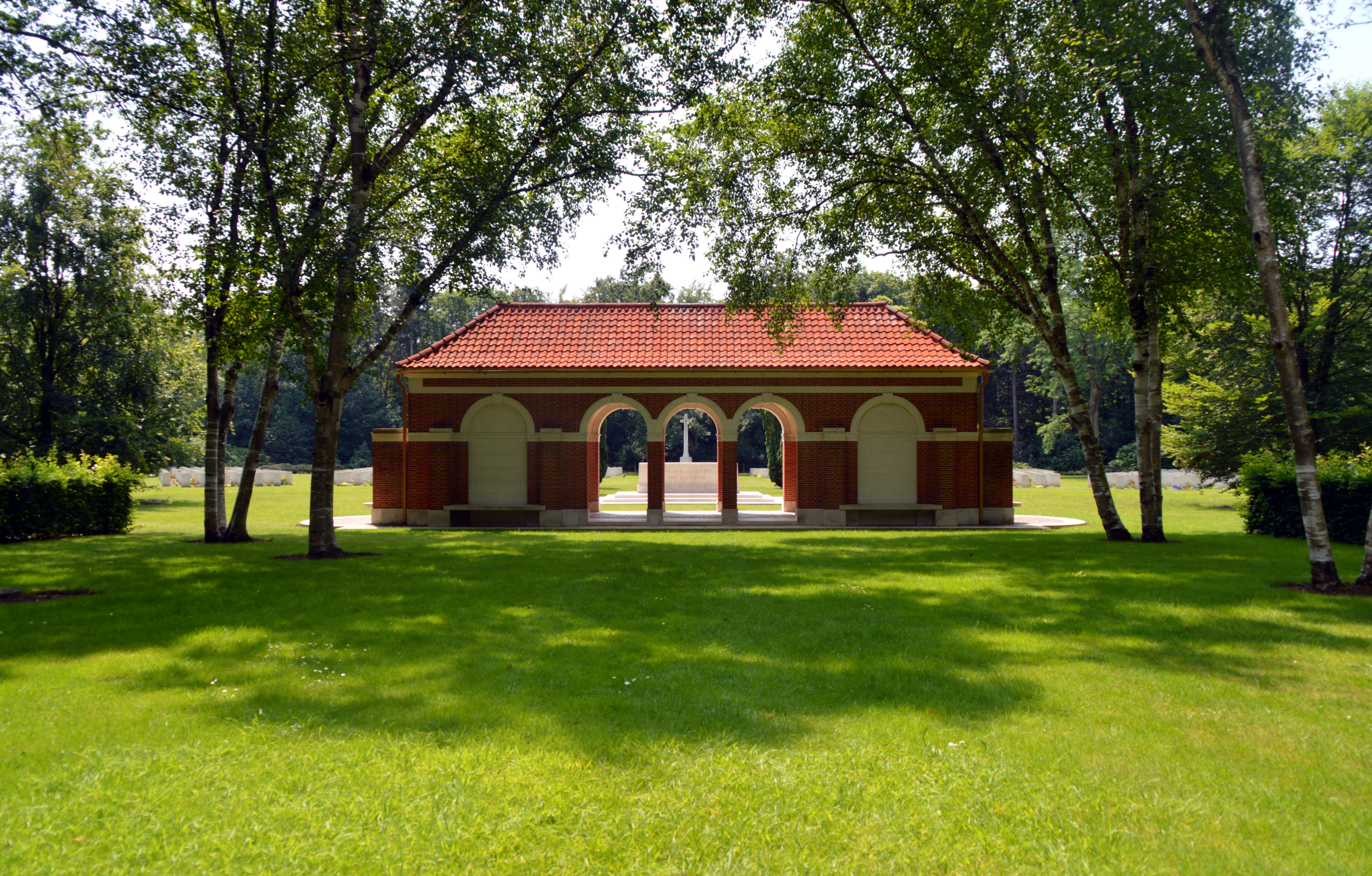
- For soldiers who were killed during World War II
- Established: 1945
- Unveiled: 1947
- Location: 51.8219°N 5.8299°E; Nijmegen, Netherlands
- Total burials: 1,643
- Unknowns: 99

Burials by nation
- Allied Forces: British Commonwealth 1,629; Unidentified 99; Other nationalities 13

Burials by war
- World War II: 1,643

The Jonkerbos War Cemetery and Memorial is located in the town of Nijmegen, Netherlands. The cemetery contains 1,643 British Commonwealth and foreign service personnel of World War II. It was built to a design by Commission architect Philip Hepworth.

On Remembrance Day 2022 (May 4) the cemetery was vandalized with swastikas and other paintings such as the Ukrainian flag and references to Azov.

== Background ==
On the site of this cemetery the preparation camp was stationed for the Waal Crossing during Operation Market Garden. Approximately 400 soldiers were first buried at an army complex in the neighborhood and were reburied in 1947 on this site.

There are 1,389 Britons, 88 Canadians, 34 Australians, 21 New Zealanders, 7 Polish, 5 Belgians, 1 Dutch and 1 Russian military buried here.

== Images ==
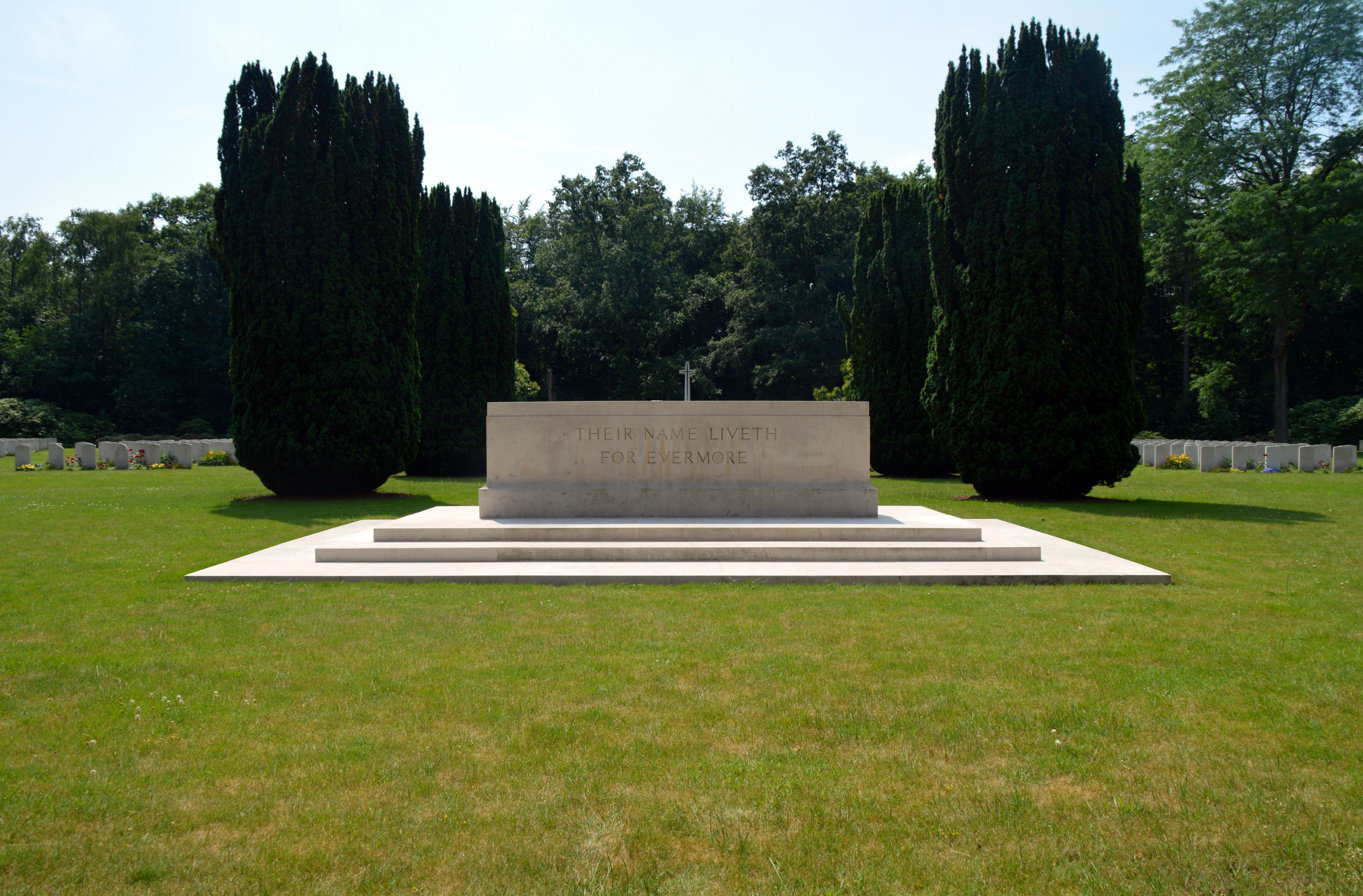
War memorial

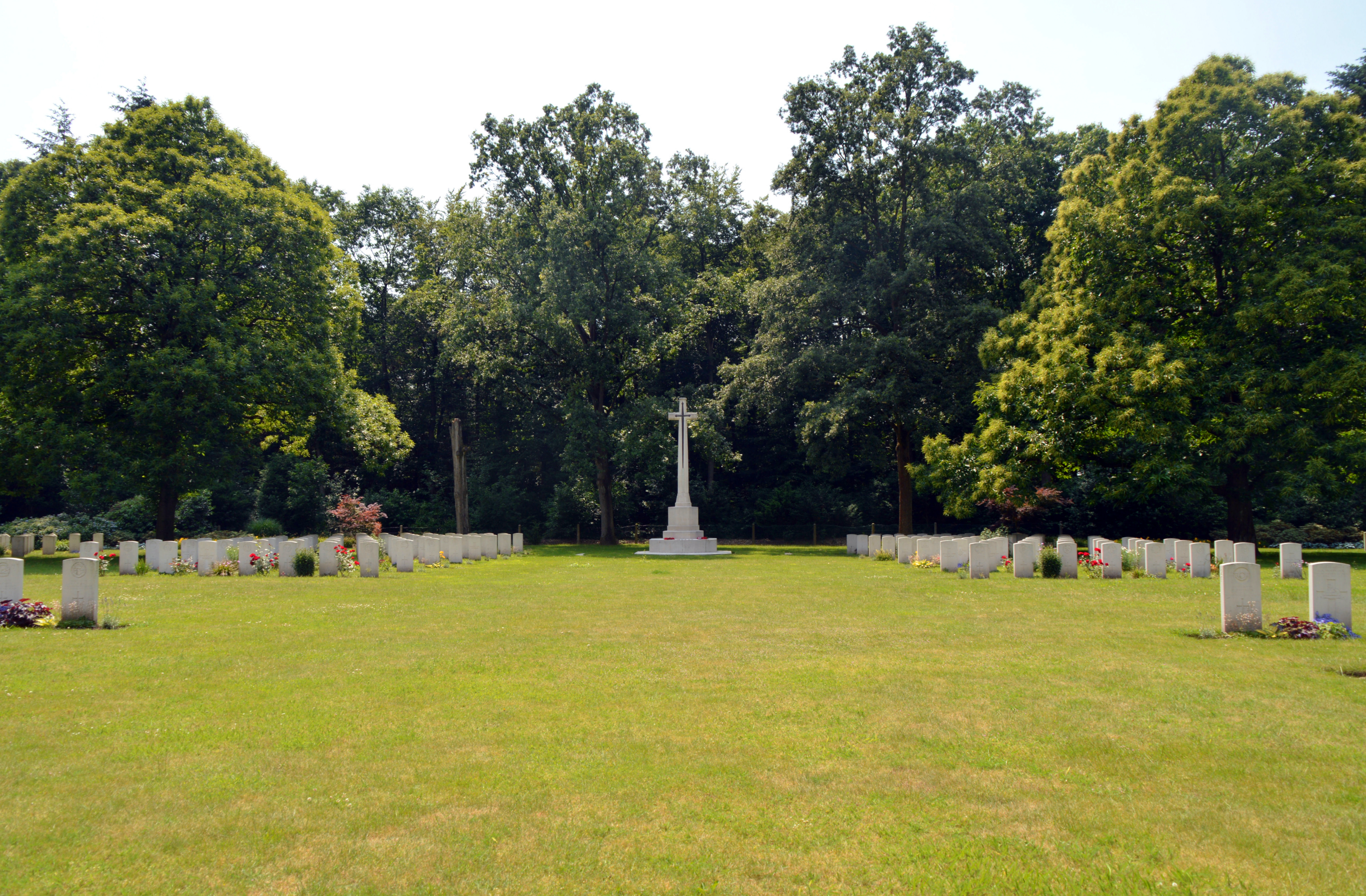
Cross of Sacrifice

== Nearby Commonwealth War Graves ==
- Arnhem Oosterbeek War Cemetery
- Groesbeek Canadian War Cemetery
- Mook War Cemetery
