= Arnhem Oosterbeek War Cemetery =

WWII War cemetery in Netherlands

- Commonwealth War Graves Commission
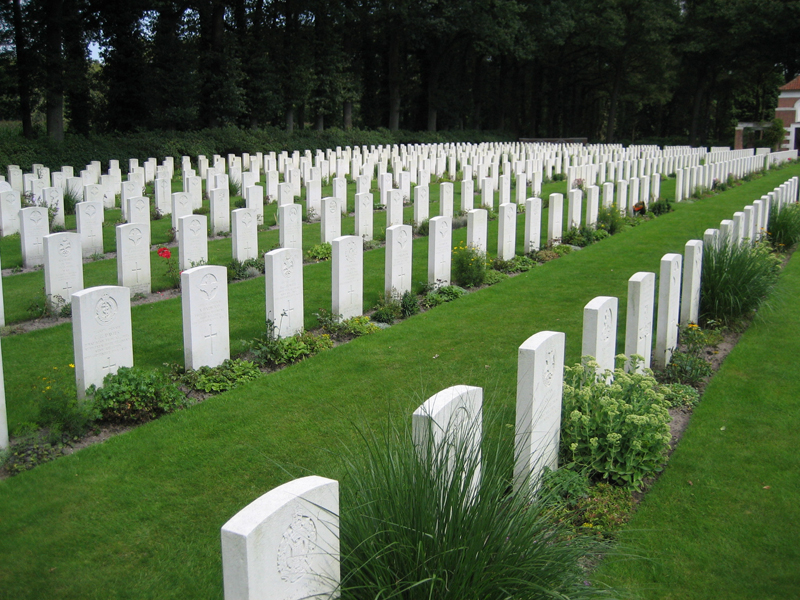
- The Airborne Cemetery
- Used for those deceased 1944–1945
- Established: 1945
- Location: 51°59′35″N 05°50′54″E near Oosterbeek, Arnhem, Netherlands.
- Total burials: 1770
- Unknowns: 244
- Commemorated: 1691

Burials by nation
- United Kingdom: 1410; Poland: 73; Canada: 32; Netherlands: 6 Australia: 4 New Zealand: 4

Burials by war
- World War II

The Arnhem Oosterbeek War Cemetery, more commonly known as the Airborne Cemetery, is a Commonwealth War Graves Commission cemetery in Oosterbeek, near Arnhem, the Netherlands. It was established in 1945 and is home to 1,764 graves from the Second World War besides four later non-war graves and there are special memorials of two personnel buried elsewhere. Most of the men buried in the cemetery were Allied servicemen killed in the Battle of Arnhem, an Allied attempt to cross the Rhine in 1944, or in the liberation of the city the following year. Men killed in these battles are still discovered in the surrounding area even in the 21st century, and so the number of people interred in the cemetery continues to grow.

== Background ==
In September 1944 the Allies launched Operation Market Garden, an attempt by the British 2nd Army to bypass the Siegfried Line and advance into the Ruhr, Germany's industrial heartland. The operation required the 1st Airborne Corps to seize several bridges over rivers and canals in the Netherlands, allowing ground forces to advance rapidly through the Netherlands and cross the River Rhine.

The British 1st Airborne Division was tasked with securing the most distant objectives; bridges over the Lower Rhine at Arnhem. The division dropped onto the area on 17 September and a small force was able to secure the Arnhem road bridge. However the unexpected presence of SS Panzer troops of the II SS Panzerkorps meant the Allies were never able to fully secure their objectives and so after nine days without sufficient reinforcement by the advancing ground forces, the division was withdrawn on 25 September.

In the 9 days of battle almost 2000 Allied soldiers were killed (some of whom died of their wounds or in captivity after the battle). These included over 1174 men of the British 1st Airborne Division, 219 men of the Glider Pilot Regiment, 92 men of the Polish 1st Independent Parachute Brigade, 368 men of the RAF, 79 re-supply dispatchers of the RASC, 25 men of XXX Corps and 27 men of US IX Troop Carrier Command. The exact number of German dead is unknown, but is believed to be at least 1300. Additionally it is believed 453 Dutch civilians were killed during the battle.

== Cemetery ==
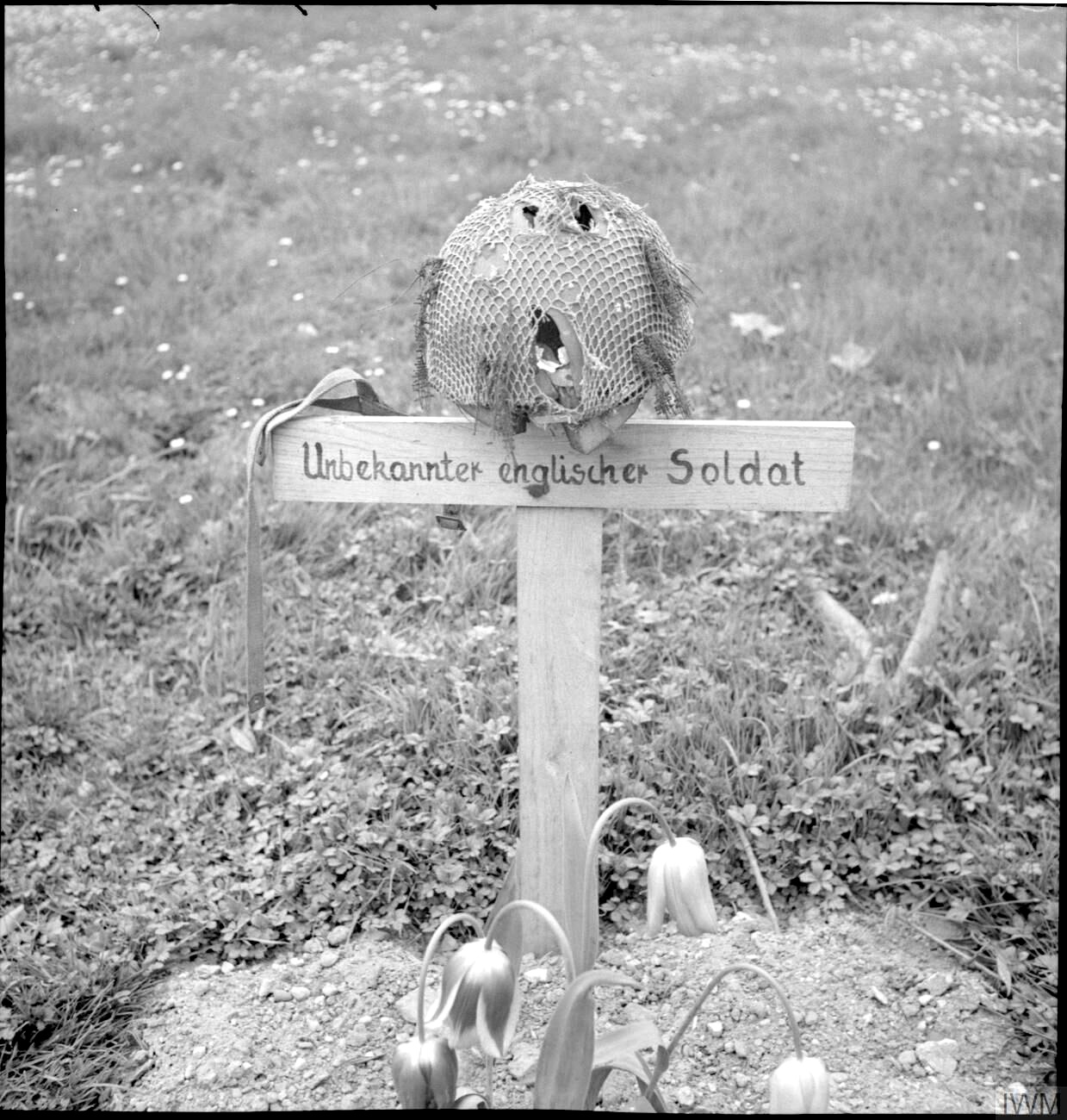
Grave of an unknown paratrooper, killed in the Battle of Arnhem, 1944. Photographed in April 1945

Owing to the Allied withdrawal, the vast majority of their dead had to be left on the battlefield. Here they were buried in simple field graves (some little more than their own slit trenches) or in small mass graves dug by the Germans. Kate Ter Horst, whose house was used as a first aid post during the battle, found the graves of 57 men in her garden when she returned after the war. After Arnhem was liberated in April 1945, Grave Registration Units of the British 2nd Army moved into the area and began to locate the Allied dead. A small field north of Oosterbeek was offered on perpetual loan by the Netherlands government to the Imperial War Graves Commission (now Commonwealth War Graves Commission) in June 1945 and the dead were reburied there. Many of those killed during Arnhem's liberation were also buried at the same site. The cemetery was completed in February 1946, originally with the graves marked by metal crosses, although these were replaced by headstones in 1952. Most of the German dead were buried in the SS Heroes Cemetery near Arnhem after the battle, but reburied in Ysselsteyn German war cemetery after the war.

The Commonwealth War Graves Commission records 1759 graves in the cemetery as of 2023. 1684 of these are Commonwealth, including British, Canadian, Australian and New Zealanders. The cemetery is also the last resting place of 73 Polish soldiers, (many of them exhumed and moved from Driel, to the disappointment of Driel's residents) and 8 Dutch civilians – some killed in the fighting and some former Commission employees. 243 of the graves are unidentified.

As of 2003 there were still 138 Allied men with no known grave in the area, and they are commemorated at the Groesbeek Memorial. However, evidence of the battle is often discovered even today, and the bodies of Allied servicemen are reinterred at the Airborne Cemetery. When found, bodies are exhumed and Dutch Graves Registration staff attempt to identify them before they are reburied. One soldier of the Border Regiment was discovered and reburied in the cemetery in 2005 and another who had previously been unidentified was reburied in 2006.

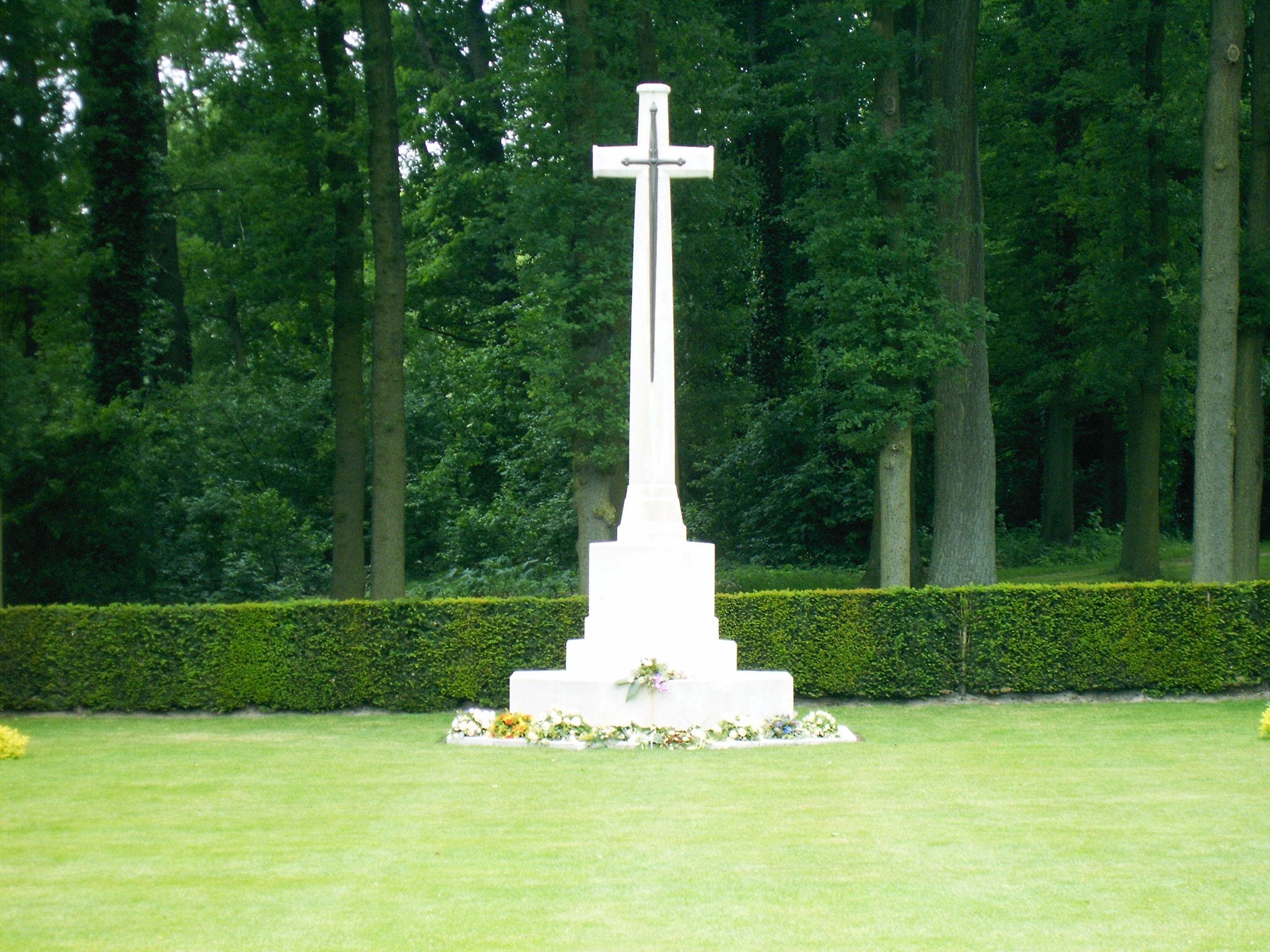
The Cross of Sacrifice, the main monument in the cemetery

Five men were awarded the Victoria Cross after the battle, four of them posthumously. Three of the men now rest in the cemetery; Lieutenant John Hollington Grayburn of the 2nd Battalion, Parachute Regiment; Flight Lieutenant David Samuel Anthony Lord of 271 Squadron, Royal Air Force and Captain Lionel Ernest Queripel of the 10th Battalion, Parachute Regiment. Lance-Sergeant John Daniel Baskeyfield of the 2nd Battalion South Staffordshire Regiment has no known grave and is commemorated instead at Groesbeek Memorial. Major Robert Henry Cain, also of 2nd Battalion, South Staffordshire Regiment, survived the battle and was buried on the Isle of Man when he died in 1974.

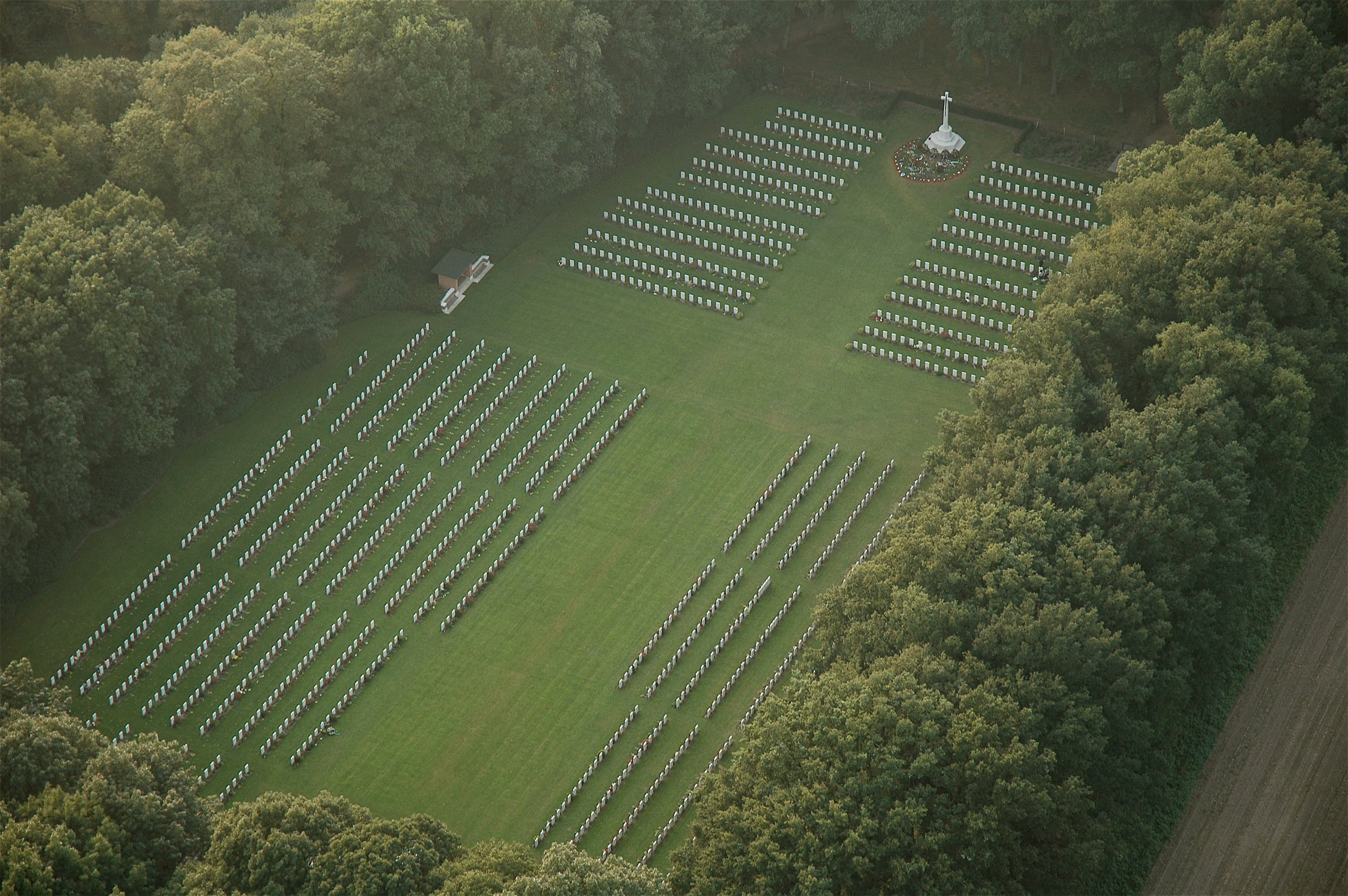
Aerial photo

Opposite the Airborne Cemetery is a civilian graveyard with a small Commonwealth War Graves Commission plot containing the graves of nine airmen shot down shortly before the battle. It is also home to Lipmann Kessel, a surgeon with the 16th (Parachute) Field Ambulance during the battle, who wished to be buried near his men after his death in 1986. Similarly, the Moscowa Cemetery three miles east contains the graves of 36 aircrew killed before the battle, and one unidentified soldier. Not all of the Allied dead from the Battle of Arnhem are interred at the cemetery. Some 300 men who were killed when flying into battle, while trying to escape or who succumbed to wounds later, are buried in civilian cemeteries in the Netherlands, Belgium, the UK and the US. Sixty men who died in prisoner of war camps after the battle are buried in Germany.

== Airborne commemoration service ==
In the summer of 1945 several hundred veterans of the battle were detached from operations in Norway and returned to Arnhem to take part in filming for the war movie Theirs Is the Glory. While there they attended the first commemorative event at the cemetery. This event continued every year, and was attended by veterans, local residents and over 1000 school children who laid flowers on the graves of the dead. After the 25th anniversary in 1969, the Parachute Regiment approached Dutch organisers to suggest ending the ceremony, believing the battle to have passed sufficiently into history. The Dutch were vehemently and emotionally opposed to the idea and thus the ceremony continues to be held annually during the first weekend of each September.

== See also ==
- Airborne Museum The nearby museum about the battle.
- Airborne March The annual commemorative march around Arnhem.
- World War II memorials and cemeteries in the Netherlands

== Nearby Commonwealth War Graves ==
- Groesbeek Canadian War Cemetery
- Mook War Cemetery
- Jonkerbos War Cemetery
- Rhenen Begraafplaats General Cemetery

== Bibliography ==
- Baynes, John (1993). Urquhart of Arnhem: The Life of Major General R E Urquhart CB, DSO. Brassey's. ISBN 0-08-041318-8.
- Johnstone, Iain (1977). The Arnhem Report: The story behind A Bridge Too Far. Allen. ISBN 0-352-39775-6.
- Middlebrook, Martin (1994). Arnhem 1944: The Airborne Battle. Viking. ISBN 0-670-83546-3.
- Steer, Frank (2003). Arnhem: The Bridge. Battleground Europe, Market Garden. Leo Cooper. ISBN 0-85052-939-5.
- Waddy, John (1999). A Tour of the Arnhem Battlefields. Pen & Sword Books Limited. ISBN 0-85052-571-3.
