= Groesbeek Canadian War Cemetery =

World War II cemetery in the Netherlands

- Commonwealth War Graves Commission
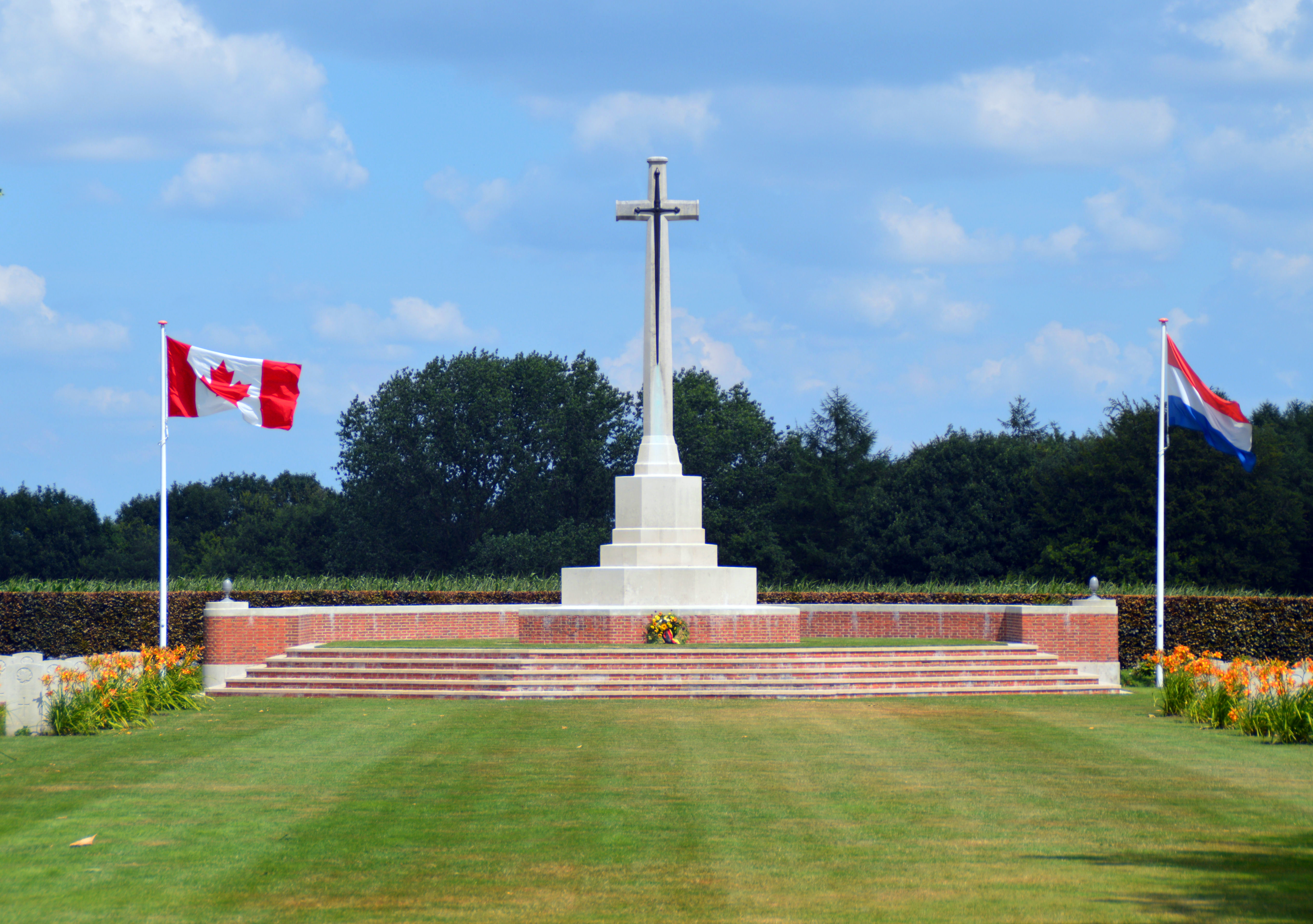
- Cross of Sacrifice
- For soldiers who were killed during World War II
- Established: February 1945
- Unveiled: 4 November 1946
- Location: 51°47′52″N 05°55′51″E near Groesbeek, Netherlands
- Total burials: 2,619
- Unknowns: 20

Burials by nation
- Allied Forces: Canada 2,338; United Kingdom 268; Belgium 3; Australia 2; Poland 2; Netherlands 1; New Zealand 1; Soviet Union 1; Yugoslavia 1

Burials by war
- World War II: 2,617

Groesbeek Canadian War Cemetery and Memorial (French:Le Cimetière de Guerre Canadien Groesbeek, Dutch:Canadese Oorlogsbegraafplaats Groesbeek) is a Second World War Commonwealth War Graves Commission military war grave cemetery, located in the village of Groesbeek, 8 km (5.0 mi) southeast of Nijmegen in the Netherlands. Of the total 2,619 burials, the cemetery contains 2,338 Canadian soldiers. It was built to a design by Commission architect Philip Hepworth.

== History ==
The cemetery is unique in that many of the dead were brought here from nearby Germany. It is one of the few cases where bodies were moved across international frontiers. It is believed that all fallen Canadian soldiers of the Rhineland battles, who were buried in German battlefields, were re-interred here (except for one who is buried in Reichswald Forest War Cemetery). General Crerar, who commanded Canadian land forces in Europe, ordered that Canadian dead were not to be buried in German soil.

The cemetery also has a Cross of Sacrifice within it.

Thousands of Dutch children tend the graves of the soldiers buried here as they do throughout the Netherlands.

== Commemoration ==
Within the cemetery stands the Groesbeek Memorial, which commemorates members of the Commonwealth land forces who died during the campaign in north-west Europe between the time of crossing the Seine River at the end of August 1944 and the end of the war in Europe. There are 1,016 names on the memorial; although since the date of completion of the name-panels, graves have been found for four men commemorated by it. The Bayeux Memorial in Normandy, France honours 103 Canadian servicemen and women.

The memorial consists of twin colonnaded buildings which face each other across the grass forecourt of the cemetery, between the entrance and the "Stone of Remembrance." The names of the men whose graves are unknown are inscribed in panels of Portland stone built into the rear walls.

== International Four Days Marches Nijmegen ==
On the third day of the International Four Days Marches Nijmegen, the route leads along the Canadian military cemetery, and the military participants commemorate their colleagues from the Second World War during an impressive ceremonial gathering.

== Notable graves ==
- Aubrey Cosens (1921–1945) of the Queen's Own Rifles of Canada VC
- John Baskeyfield (1922–1944) of the South Staffordshire Regiment VC is remembered on the memorial.
- Gustave Biéler, Frank Pickersgill and Roméo Sabourin, Canadian members of the Special Operations Executive who were sent undercover into occupied France; all three were caught by the Germans and sent to concentration camps, where they were executed. They are remembered on the memorial
- Terrence Hicks GM (1920–1944) of the 1st Parachute Squadron, Corps of Royal Engineers is remembered on the memorial (Hicks was killed in action on 19 September 1944, aged 24, in the Marktstraat area of Arnhem and has no known grave). Awarded the GM for an act of conspicuous gallantry in Gibraltar in 1942.
- William Klersy (1922–1945), a flying ace of the Royal Canadian Air Force
- Robert Malster (1913–1983), the long-time caretaker of the cemetery for the CommonWealth War Graves Commission. He is interred separately of the service men on the north side of the field next to the hedge. One might say he overlooks the field, from an unobtrusive spot on the side, not wanting to claim attention.

== Images ==
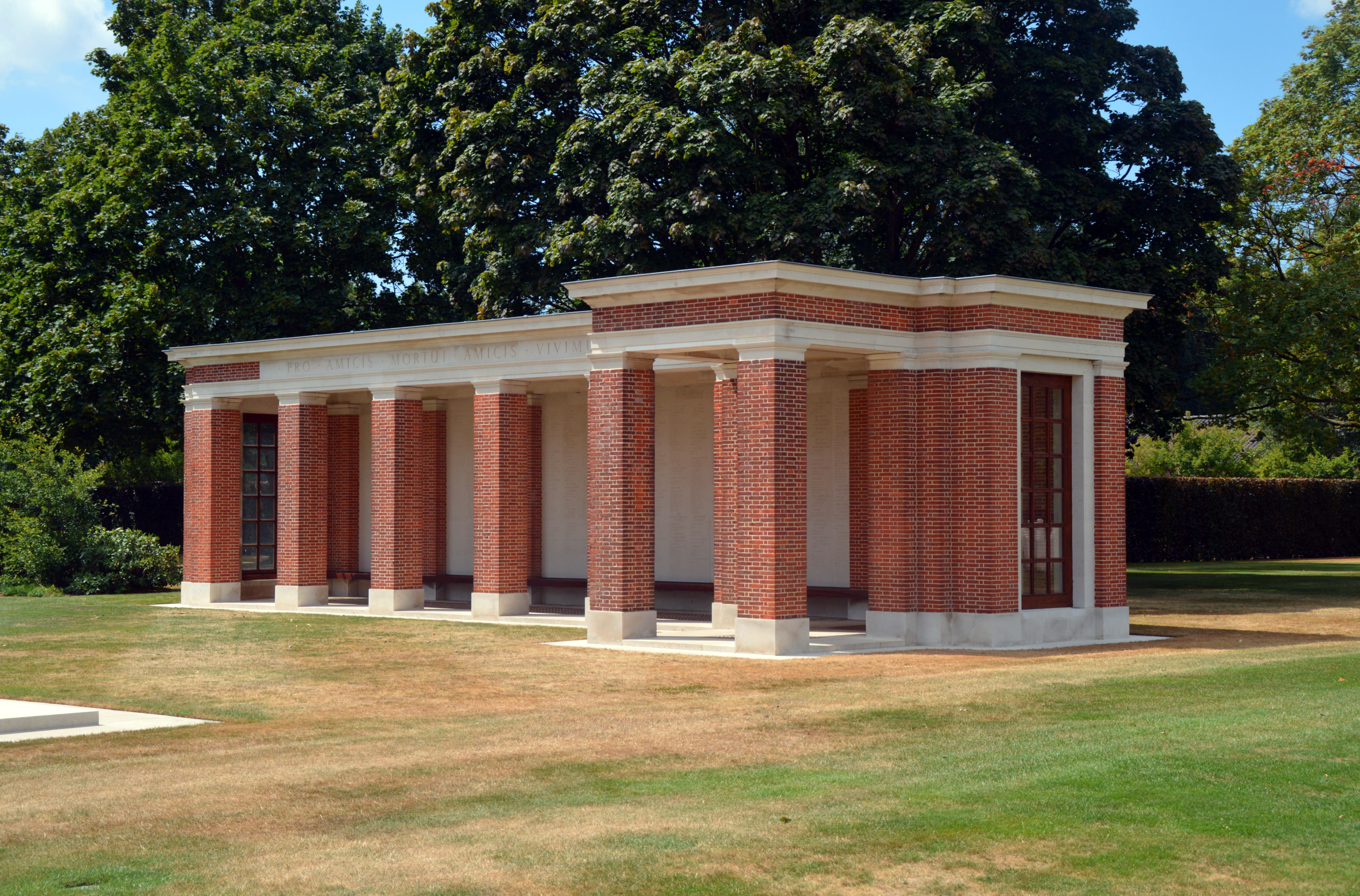
Memorial

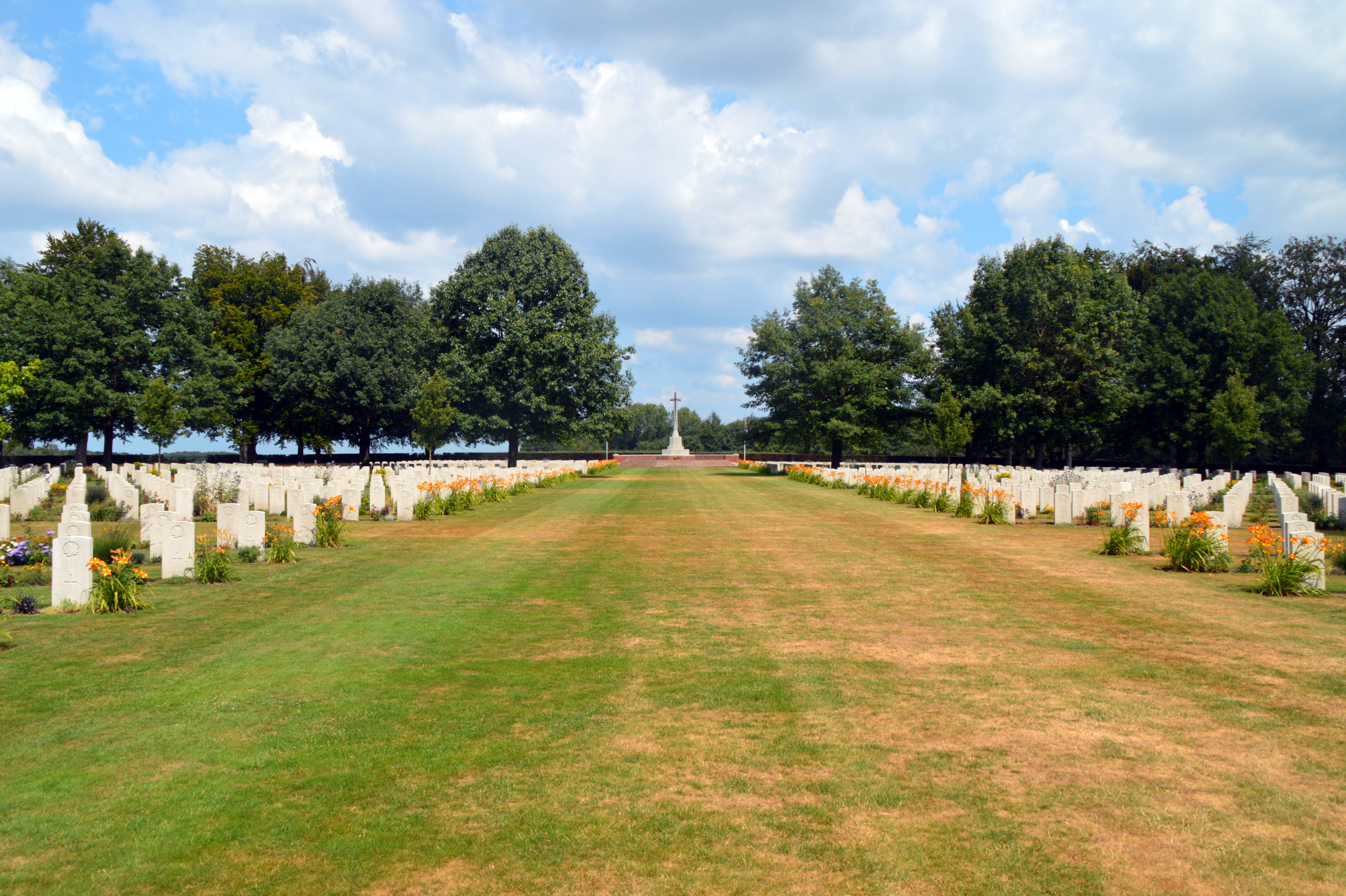
Field of Honour

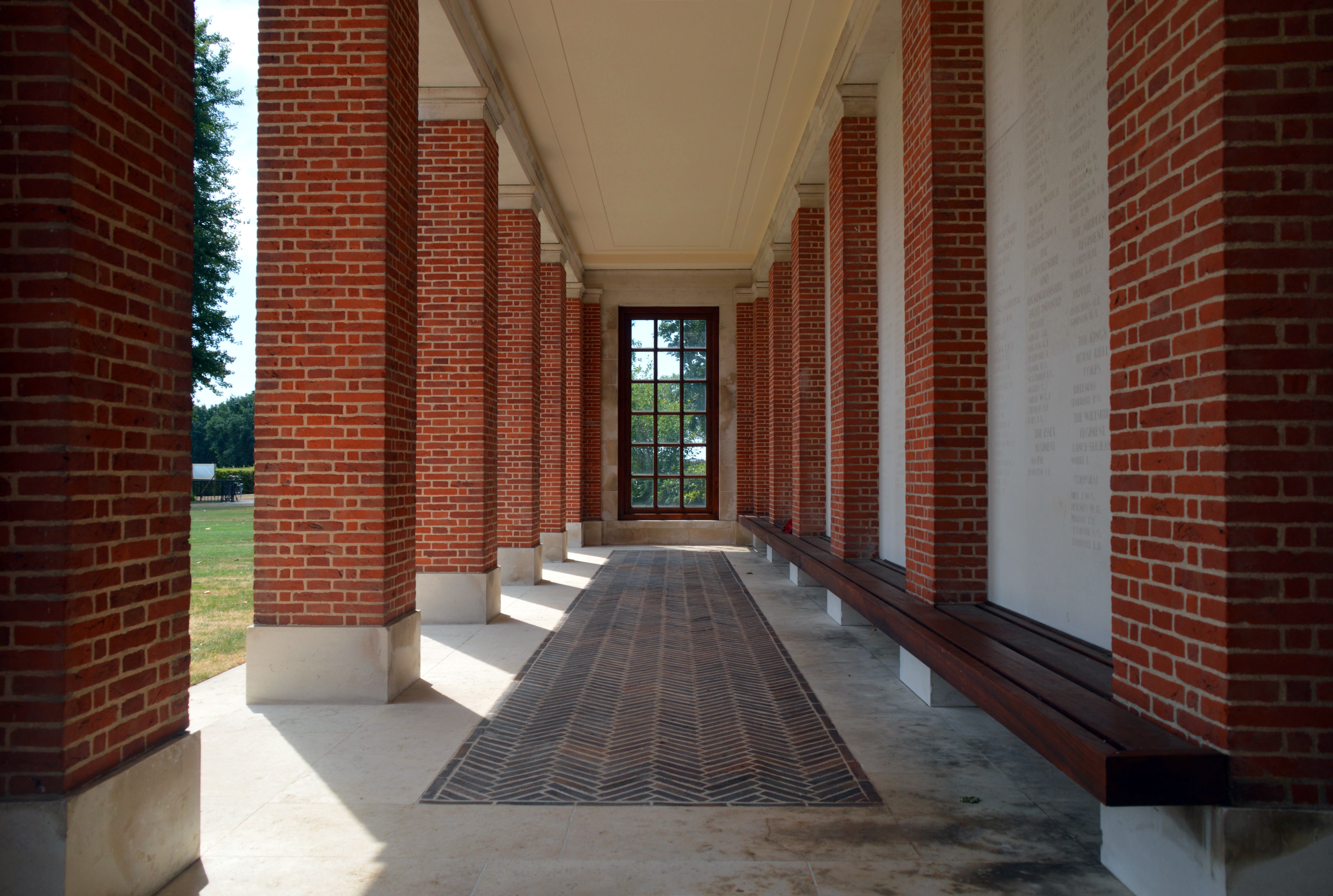
Memorial, inside

== Nearby Commonwealth War Graves ==
- Arnhem Oosterbeek War Cemetery
- Jonkerbos War Cemetery
- Mook War Cemetery
