= Arnhem–Nijmegen metropolitan area =

Former Dutch city region

Coordinates: 51°54′53″N 5°53′09″E

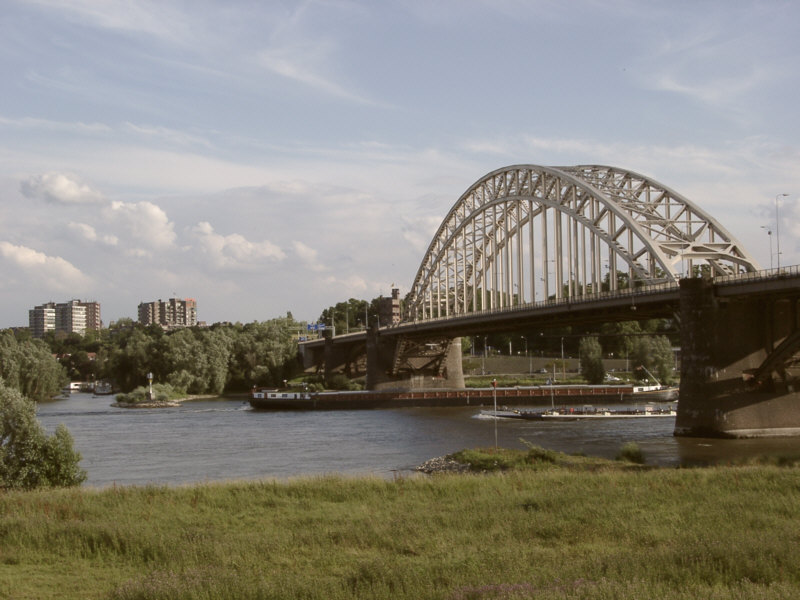
Nijmegen

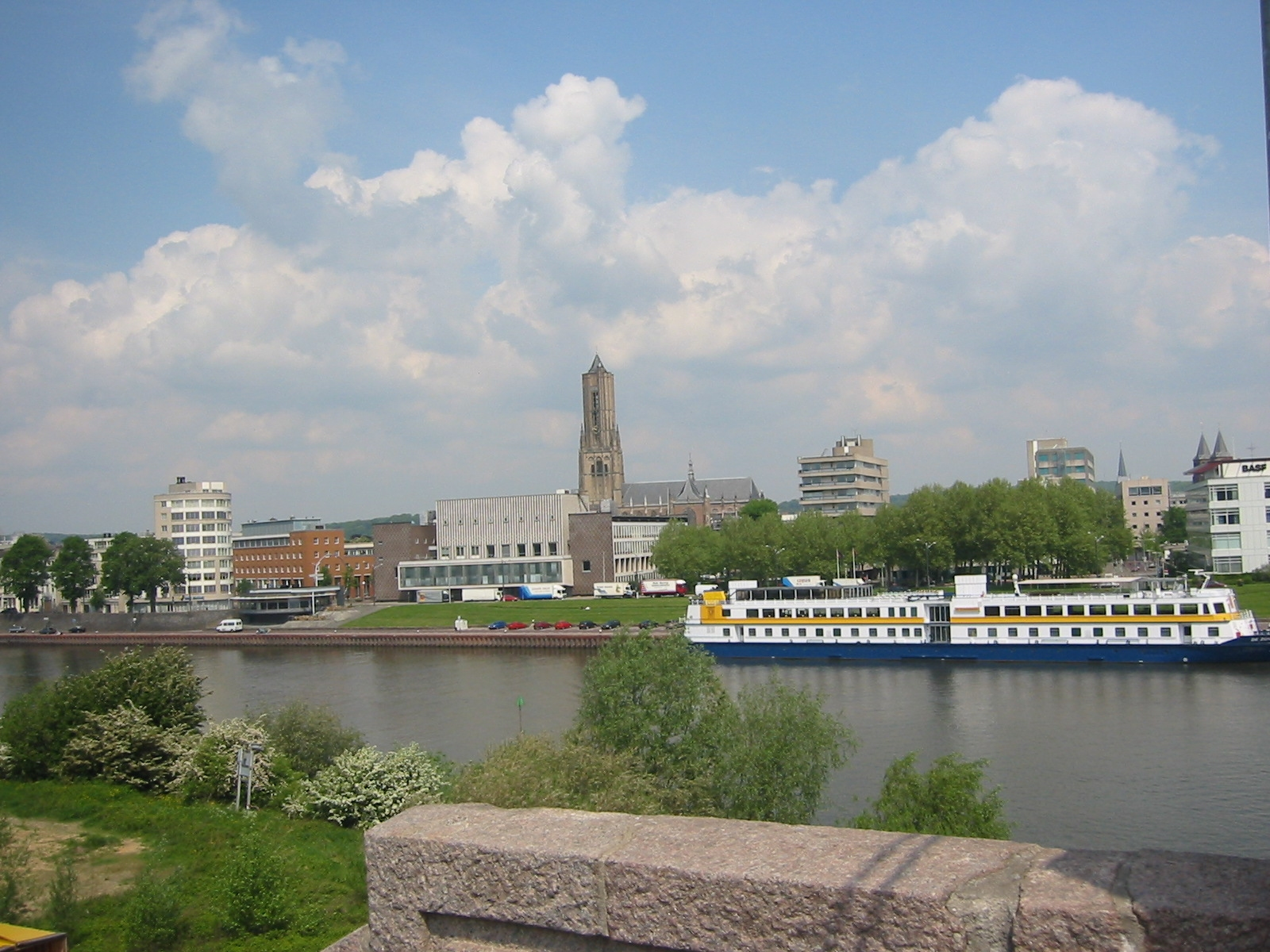
Arnhem

The Arnhem–Nijmegen metropolitan area (Dutch: Stadsregio Arnhem Nijmegen, pronounced [ˈstɑtsˌreːɣijoː ˌɑrnɛm ˈnɛimeːɣə(n); - ˌɑr(ə)nɦɛm -]; originally called Knooppunt Arnhem-Nijmegen [ˈknoːpʏnt -]) is a former Dutch plusregio, public body and intermunicipal institution. It was founded in 1988 for co-operation in the areas of housing, transport and economics for the Dutch cities of Nijmegen and Arnhem and the surrounding municipalities of Berg en Dal, Beuningen, Doesburg, Duiven, Heumen, Lingewaard, Montferland, Mook en Middelaar, Overbetuwe, Renkum, Rheden, Rijnwaarden, Rozendaal, Westervoort, Wijchen, and Zevenaar. All except Mook en Middelaar (Limburg) are in the province of Gelderland. In 2022, a total of 774,506 people lived in the municipalities (1,000 km^{2}).

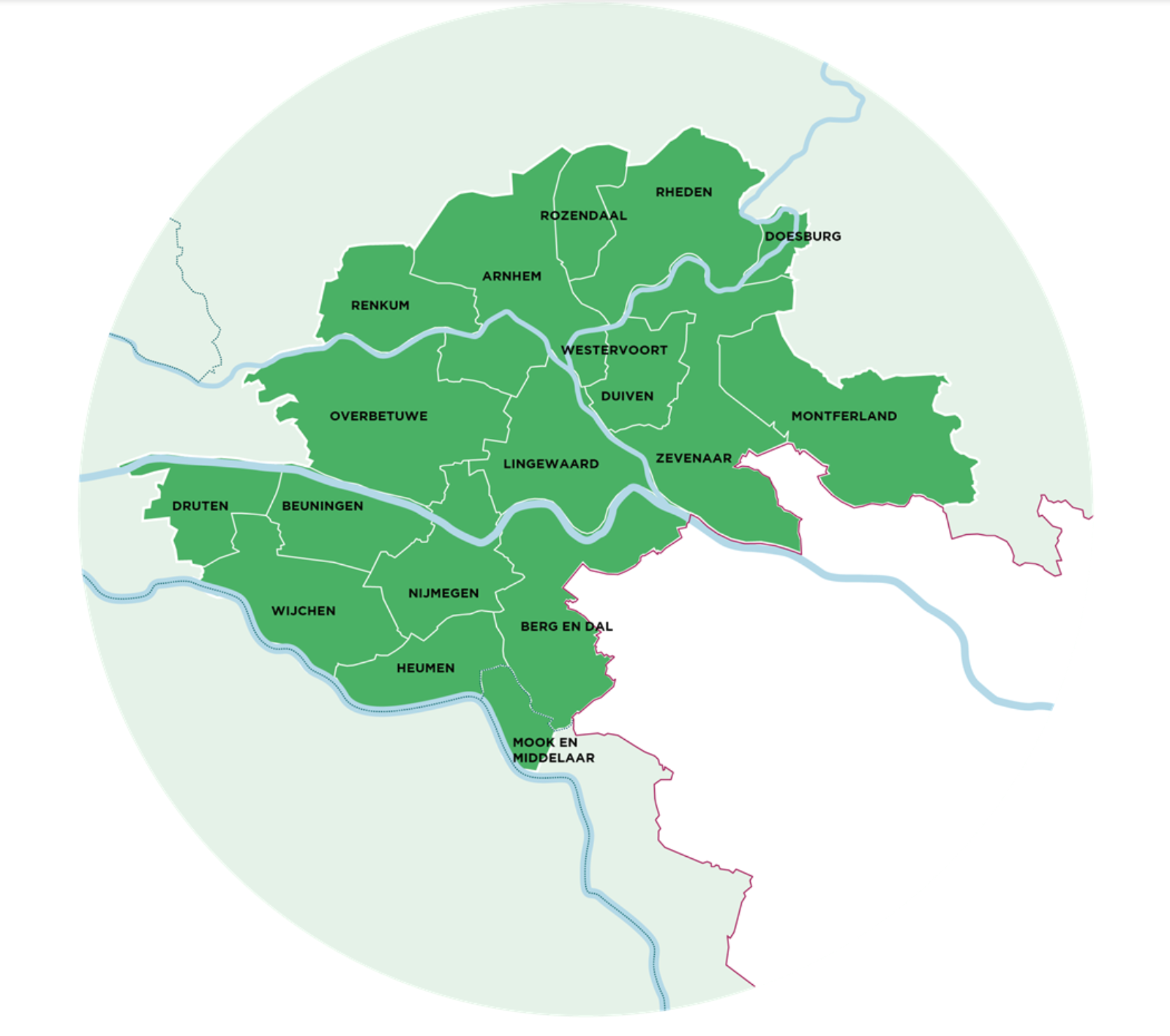
Map. Green Metropolitan Region

The Dutch Plusregio was abolished by law in 2014, and the Arnhem–Nijmegen metropolitan area closed 1 July 2015, and replaced by new arrangements for cooperation between the same eighteen municipalities. Since 2021 this has been the Arnhem-Nijmegen Green Metropolitan Region (Dutch: Groene Metropoolregio Arnhem-Nijmegen.
