= Airborne Museum 'Hartenstein' =

Museum in Oosterbeek, the Netherlands

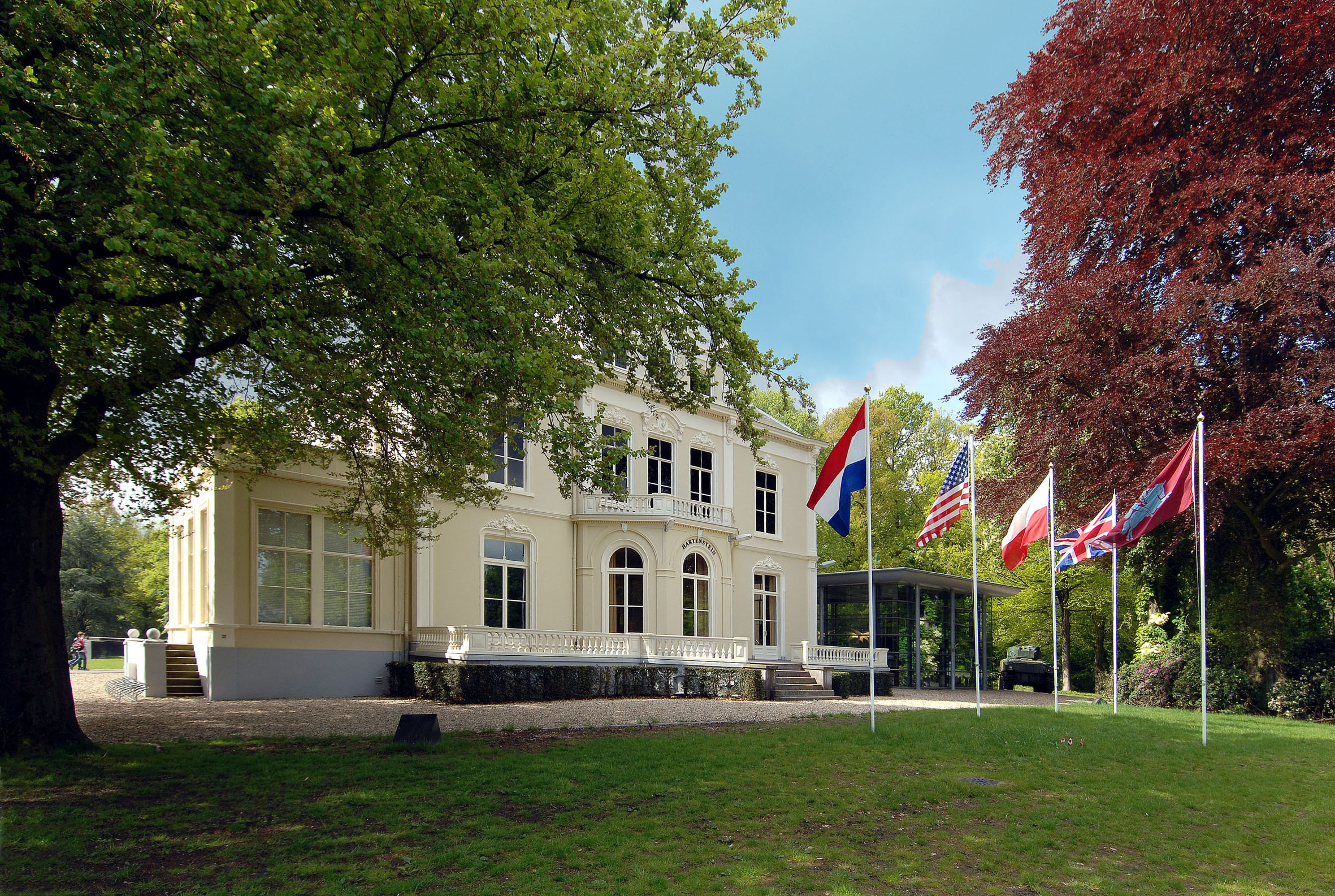
- The Airborne Museum Hartenstein, formerly the Hotel Hartenstein and the HQ of 1st Airborne Division during the Battle of Arnhem.

- Location of the museum in Gelderland and the Netherlands
- Established: 1949
- Location: Oosterbeek, Gelderland, Netherlands
- Coordinates: 51.988056°N 5.8325°E
- Type: Military History
- Website: Airborne Museum

The Airborne Museum ‘Hartenstein’ in Oosterbeek, The Netherlands is dedicated to the Battle of Arnhem in which the Allied Forces attempted to form a bridgehead on the northern banks of the Rhine river in September 1944. Hartenstein served as the headquarters of the British 1st Airborne Division. In the museum an extensive and diverse collection is displayed consisting of original weaponry, genuine uniforms and equipment used in the battle. The numerous photos and films on display provide a realistic picture which is enhanced by interviews with Allied soldiers. In addition the museum has an award-winning Airborne Experience exhibition, that depicts the area around Arnhem and Oosterbeek during the battle. The museum also provides German and civilian perspectives.

== History of the Hotel Hartenstein ==
Historical records from 1728 indicate that an inn called ‘Het Rode Hert’ (‘The Red Deer’) stood at the important crossroad of the 'Utrechtseweg' in Oosterbeek. In 1779 the inn and the surrounding land was acquired by a wealthy attorney to the Court of Gelderland named J. van der Sluys. The inn was demolished and in its place a mansion was constructed complete with adjacent annexes. The new mansion was named ‘Hartenstein’.

After the death of Van der Sluys, ‘Hartenstein’ was passed along to a variety of owners. In 1865 the present building appeared on the site and a coach house was built next to it (now the site of restaurant ‘Hartenstein@Laurie'). In 1905 the villa was extended with two conservatories. Finally, in 1942, the Municipality of Renkum became Hartenstein's new owner and transformed it into a hotel.

== Operation Market Garden and the Battle of Arnhem ==
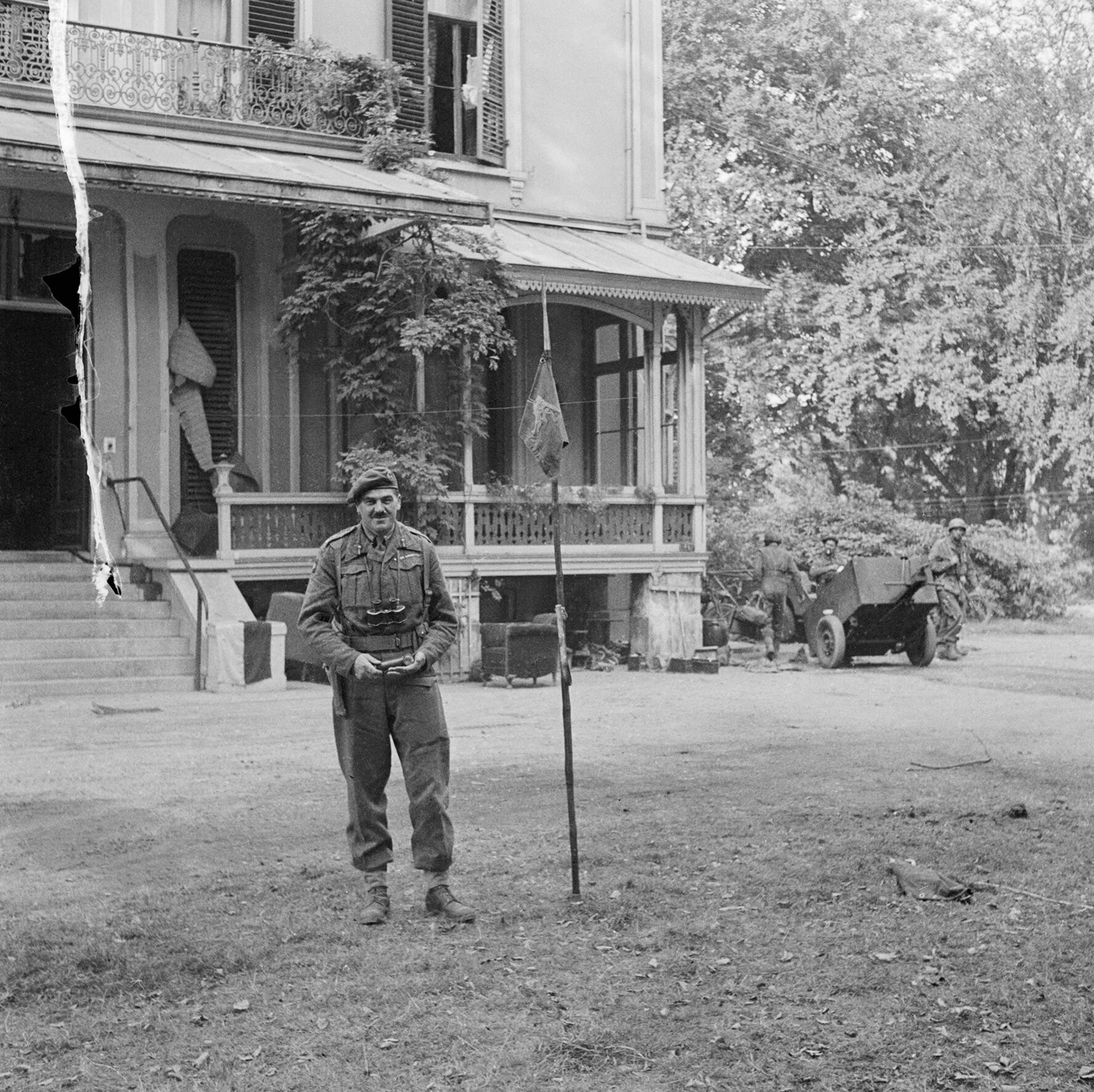
Major General Roy Urquhart shortly after returning to his Divisional HQ at the Hotel Hartenstein, 19 September.

After the invasion of Normandy in June 1944, the Allied troops made a quick advance towards Germany. The supply troops could not keep up with the troops on the front line causing the advance to a halt. A new frontline was formed in Belgium and France. To avoid the Siegfried Line, Field Marshal Bernard Montgomery had planned an operation in which British and Commonwealth forces would occupy several bridges in the Netherlands between Eindhoven and Arnhem. If this mission succeeded, the road to Germany would be open. Operation Comet as it was called was ultimately cancelled.

At the behest of Eisenhower, General Lewis Brereton adapted Montgomery's original Operation Comet and renamed it Operation Market Garden. Starting on September 17, 1944 and ending in the morning of September 26. Operation Market Garden failed due to a combination of factors: a lack of airlift to transport the British 1st Airborne Division and the Polish Brigade on the first day, 1 AAF's choice of poorly chosen drop and landing zones around Arnhem that were too far from the bridge over the Rhine and, intense German opposition by the disregarded presence of SS armored forces in the Arnhem area. The time table for XXX Corps was ahead of schedule by some 36 hours when it arrived at Nijmegen expecting to cross unhindered. They arrived to find that the American 82nd Airborne under General Gavin had failed to take the bridge in Nijmegen upon landing as ordered whilst it was lightly defended, this now forced XXX Corps to deploy and clear the town of Nijmegen and then assault across the bridge themselves with the assistance of the 101st Airborne, delaying their advance on Arnhem by 3 days which allowed the German forces to reinforce and seal off Arnhem from relief.

In the area around Arnhem more than ten thousand men of the British 1st Airborne Division and the Glider Pilot Regiment landed north of the Lower Rhine, whilst the Polish 1st Independent Parachute Brigade landed on its southern banks in order to capture the Arnhem Road Bridge. Over 700 men under the command of John Dutton Frost did manage to reach the bridge and held its northern ramp for 4 days, but the bulk of the British forces were engaged by superior German forces (including the II SS Panzer Corps) and became trapped in Oosterbeek. Major General Roy Urquhart chose ‘Hartenstein’ as his headquarters. After holding out north of the Rhine for nine days, the division had to be withdrawn, although just over 2,000 of the 10,000 men who had landed reached the Poles south of the river. The Allied troops lost the Battle of Arnhem and ‘Hartenstein’ was left in a heavily damaged condition.

== The museum ==
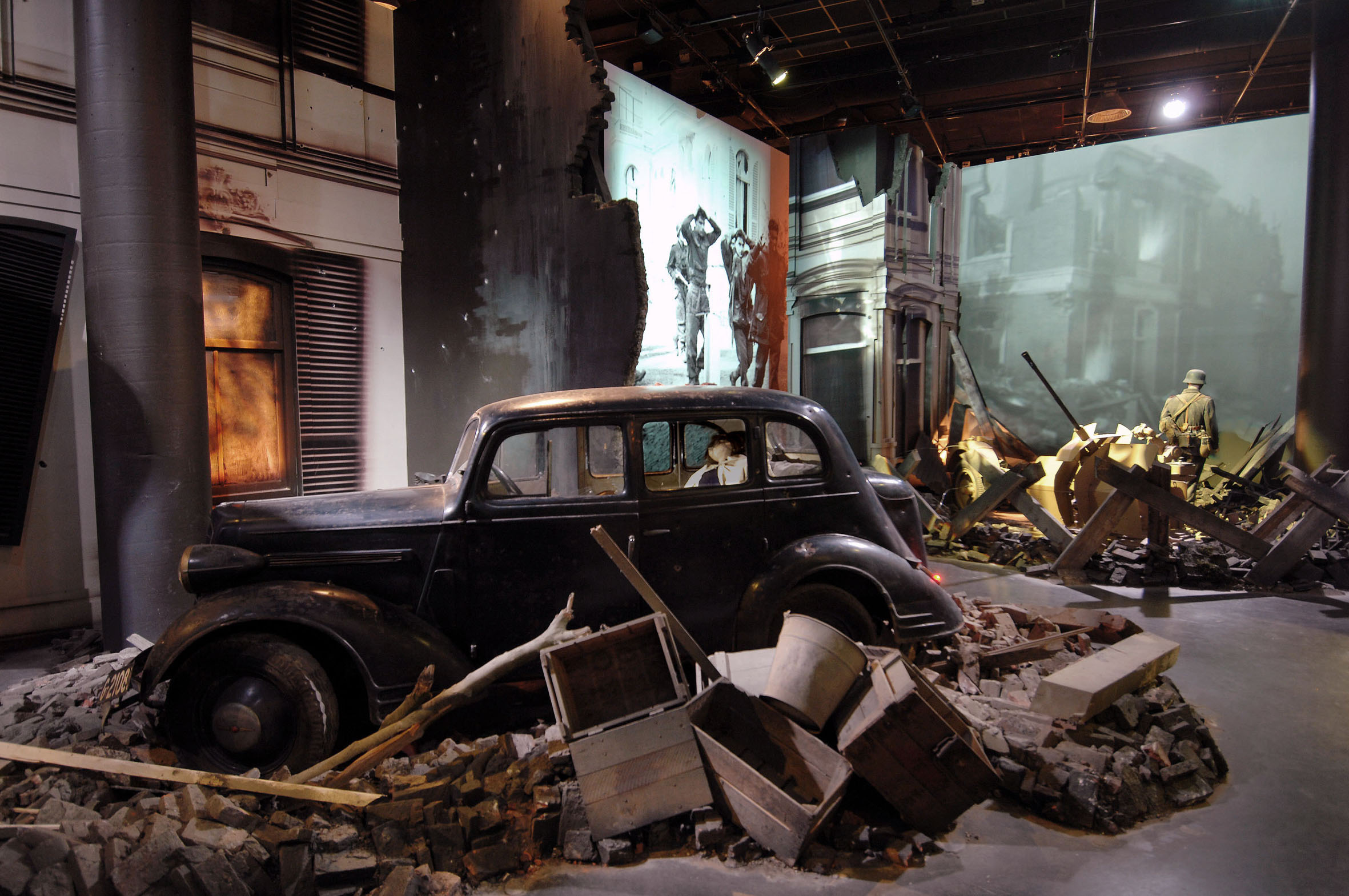
Airborne Experience in the basement of Hartenstein

Shortly after the Second World War, plans were made to open a museum to commemorate the battle. In 1949 Doorwerth Castle near the Rhine was chosen as the museum's site. Soon it became evident that Doorwerth could not accommodate the display of the growing collection and a better location was sought. Hotel ‘Hartenstein’, which functioned again as a hotel after the war, was chosen as the ideal place for a museum and was purchased. On 11 May 1978, Major General Roy Urquhart officially opened the Airborne Museum ‘Hartenstein’.

In 2008, the museum temporarily closed for an extensive renovation and expansion: a brand new lobby and basement were added to the building. The basement is used to display the new 'Airborne Experience', a series of dioramas of the battle. The display was awarded the Gouden Reiger (“The Golden Heron”) a Dutch award for audience interaction in the category "three-dimensional media interaction" In September 2009, on the 65th anniversary of the Battle of Arnhem, the museum was reopened.

Each year the Airborne Museum ‘Hartenstein’ is involved in events commemorating the Battle of Arnhem. It also serves as a gathering place for veterans, civilians and young people. The museum is close to the Arnhem Oosterbeek War Cemetery where several hundred of the Allied casualties are buried. Every year the participants of the Airborne March pay a special tribute when the parade is held in front of the museum.

== Free Information Centre "Airborne at the Bridge" ==
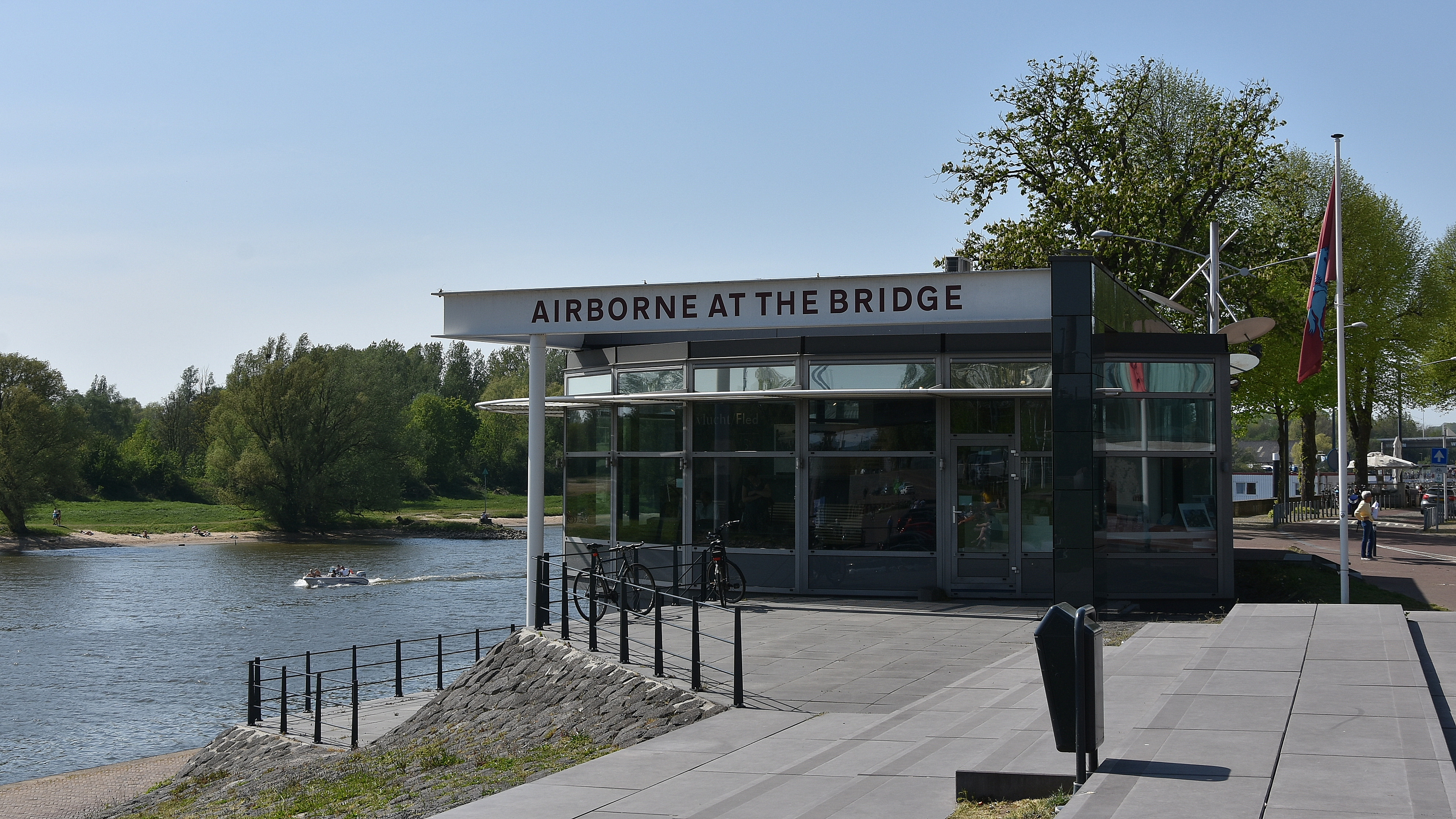
Free Information Centre "Airborne at the Bridge", an appendix near the John Frost Bridge in Arnhem

Since 2017 an information center about the Battle of Arnhem has been located on Arnhem's Rijnkade, opposite the John Frost Bridge. Its operation and design are managed by the Airborne Museum. Visitors can view artifacts and listen to stories related to the Battle of Arnhem free of charge. A 3D presentation also allows visitors to virtually experience the paratrooper landings, the advance to the bridge, the British defeat, and the influx of refugees that began in Arnhem.

== Bibliography ==
- Steer, Frank (2003). Battleground Europe - Market Garden. The Bridge - Arnhem. Leo Cooper. ISBN 0-85052-939-5.
- airbornemuseum.nl
- mooigelderland.nl
- Ed. Mayer, S.L., Encyclopedia of World War II (Feltham 1977)
- Ryan, C., A Bridge too Far(Bussum 1974)
- Leloux, H.J., en Duyts, W.J.M., In Heerlijckheit en Hoofdkwartier 1949-1989 (Renkum 1989)
- Archive of Gelderland
