= Mook en Middelaar =

Mook en Middelaar Mook en Middelar
- Municipality
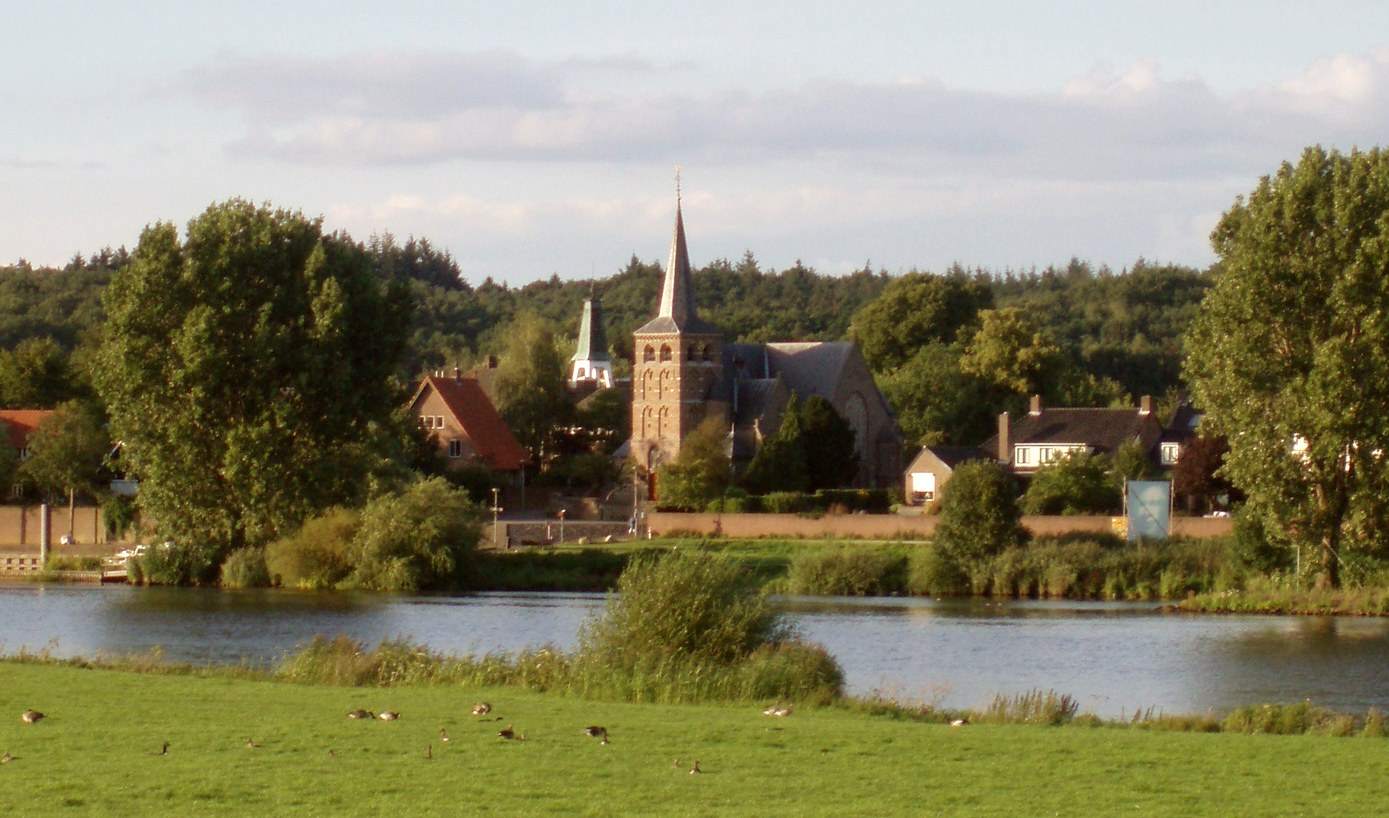
- Mook town centre across the Meuse

- Flag Coat of arms

- Location in Limburg

- Location within Netherlands
- Coordinates: 51°45′N 5°53′E
- Country: Netherlands
- Province: Limburg

Government
  - Body: Municipal council
  - Mayor: Inge van Dijk (VVD)

Area
  - Total: 18.81 km^{2} (7.26 sq mi)
  - Land: 17.38 km^{2} (6.71 sq mi)
  - Water: 1.43 km^{2} (0.55 sq mi)
- Elevation: 12 m (39 ft)

Population (January 2021)
  - Total: 7,909
  - Density: 455/km^{2} (1,180/sq mi)
- Time zone: UTC+1 (CET)
  - Summer (DST): UTC+2 (CEST)
- Postcode: 6584–6587
- Area code: 024
- Website: mookenmiddelaar.nl

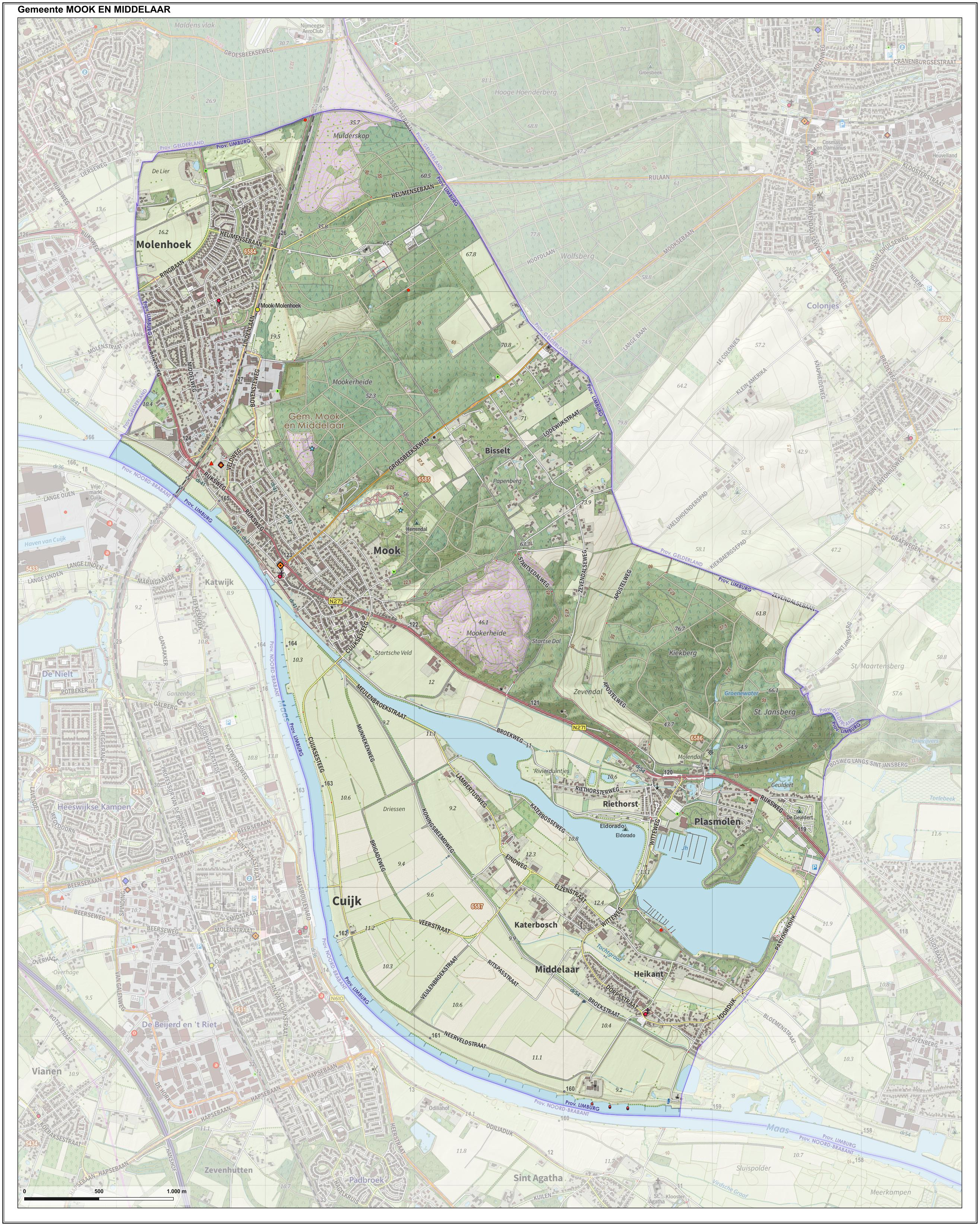
Dutch Topographic map of Mook en Middelaar, June 2015

Mook en Middelaar (Dutch: [ˈmoːk ɛ(m) ˈmɪdəlaːr]; Limburgish: Mook en Middelar) is a municipality in the upper southeastern part of the Netherlands, at the northern tip of the province of Limburg and is a part of Stadsregio Arnhem Nijmegen. The municipality is located about 100 km from provincial capital Maastricht and has an area of 18.81 km^{2} (7.26 sq mi) of which 1.43 km^{2} (0.55 sq mi) is water.

== Population centres ==
- Middelaar
- Molenhoek
- Mook
- Plasmolen

== History ==
The municipality is situated in wooded rolling moraine landscape, created during the last ice age, about 160,000 years ago.

In Plasmolen the remains of a Roman villa from the 2nd century AD were found and on the banks of the Meuse are the remains of a Roman bridge. These remains are from the 4th century.

The Mookerheide ("Mook Heath"), situated on the border of Mook, saw the Battle of Mookerheyde in 1574 which was fought as part of the Eighty Years War. Spanish forces under Sancho d'Avila defeated the rebel forces of Louis of Nassau, who was killed.

The Mookerschans and Heumense schans were defenses on the Mookerheide probably from the 17th century. (At that time the Mookerheide area extended all the way to the citywalls of Nijmegen) The historical Mookerheideschans (defense work) has been restored and offers a beautiful view over the Meuse valley.

Middelaar belonged to Overkwartier (Upper Quarter) of Guelders or Upper Guelders. During the War of the Spanish Succession Middelaar was occupied by Prussian troops, and it remained German for about a century (until 1814).

In the Second World War a fierce battle raged around this area. In May 1940 the invaders were stopped by large bunkers on the Brabant-side of the Meuse, the railway bridge between Mook and Katwijk was blown up. In September 1944 Mook, Plasmolen and Middelaar were in the front area and the war caused much devastation. While under fire of German guns that were shooting from the woods near Groesbeek, allied soldiers had to secure the Heumen bridge over the Maas-Waal canal that was an important hub for operation Market Garden. Fierce fighting caused the front to move so the little village, of which most houses were shot in this period, was liberated to fall back in German hands, to be liberated again. Soldiers killed in this vicinity during World War II found their final resting place in Mook War Cemetery Most inhabitants of Mook and Middelaar sought refuge elsewhere until the liberation.

To support the cement industry, sand was dug out in the fields next to the river Maas (known as 'Cuyksesteeg') which consequently lead to the forming of the Mookerplassen recreational lakes, between Middelaar and the Mookerheide. After a couple of floodings in the 80s and 90s a removable lock was built to save the area from flooding again.

== Public transport ==
Mook and the municipality is served by three bus lines and has its own train station, Mook-Molenhoek railway station.

== Notable residents ==
- Karel Martens (born 1939) a Dutch freelance graphic designer, specialises in typography
- Serge Daan (1940–2018) a Dutch scientist, contributed to the field of chronobiology
- Arjen Teeuwissen (born 1971), equestrian, team silver medallist at the 2000 Summer Olympics
- Marko Koers (born 1972) a retired middle distance runner, competed at three consecutive Summer Olympics from 1992

== Gallery ==
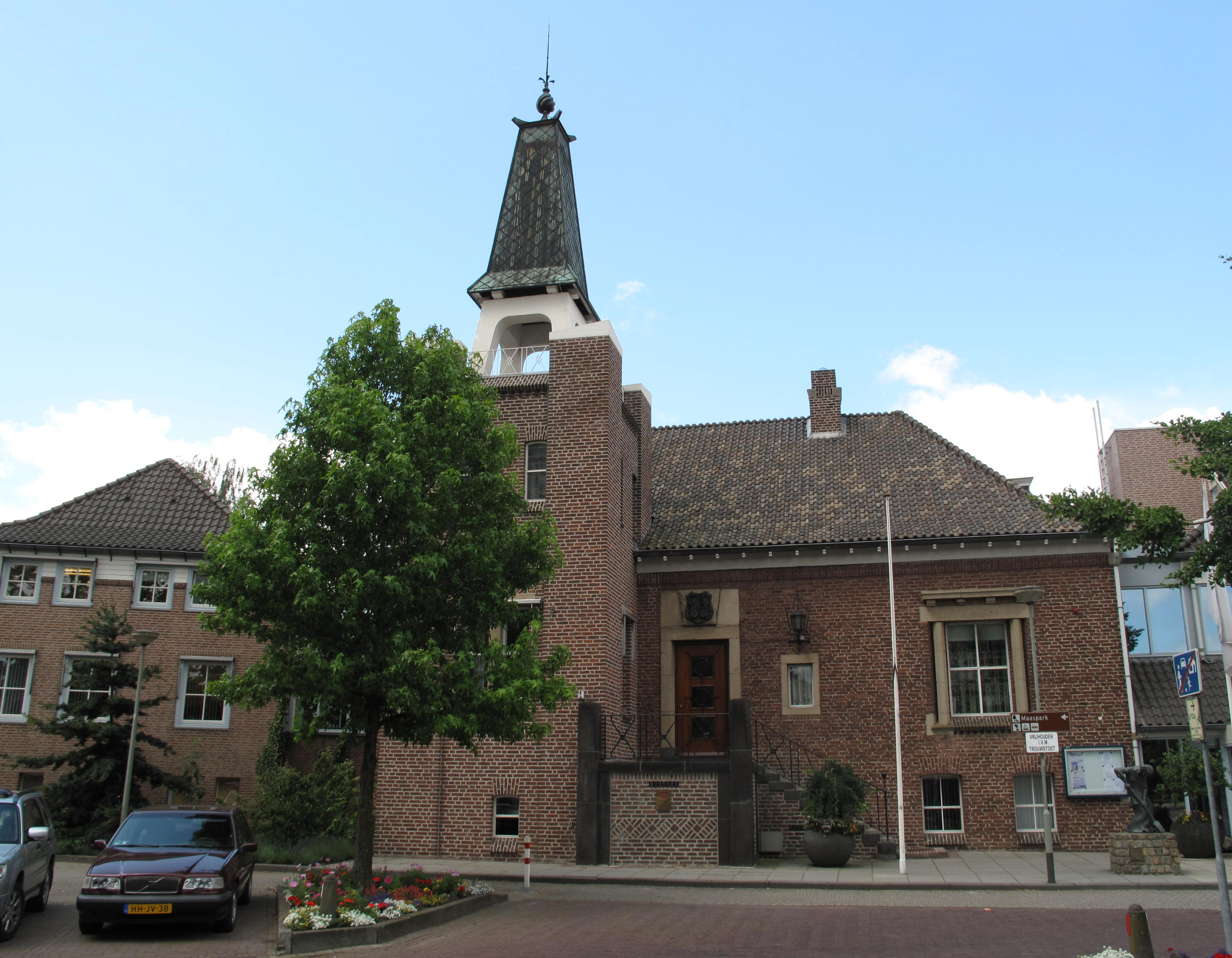
Mook, former town hall

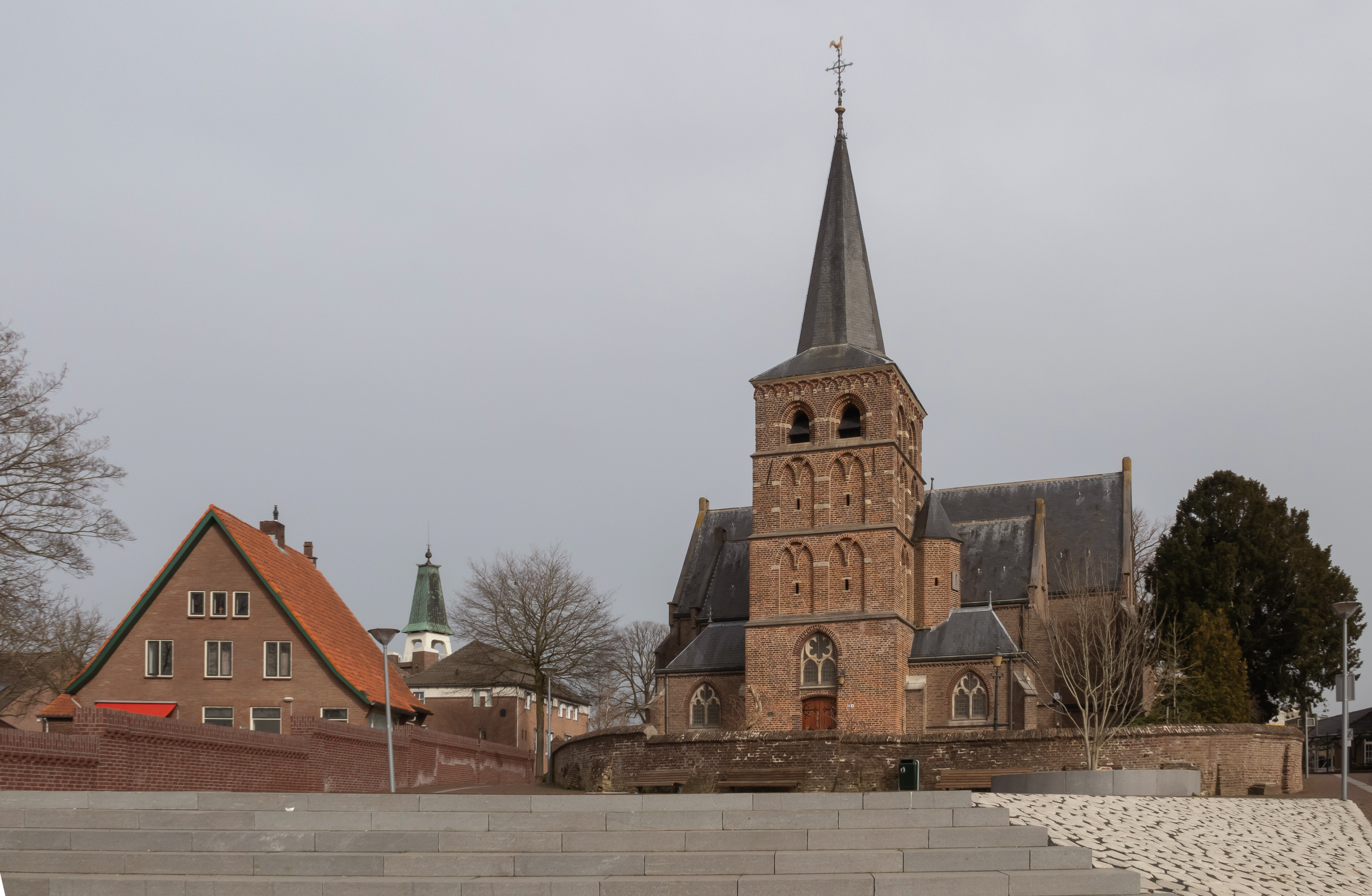
Mook, church

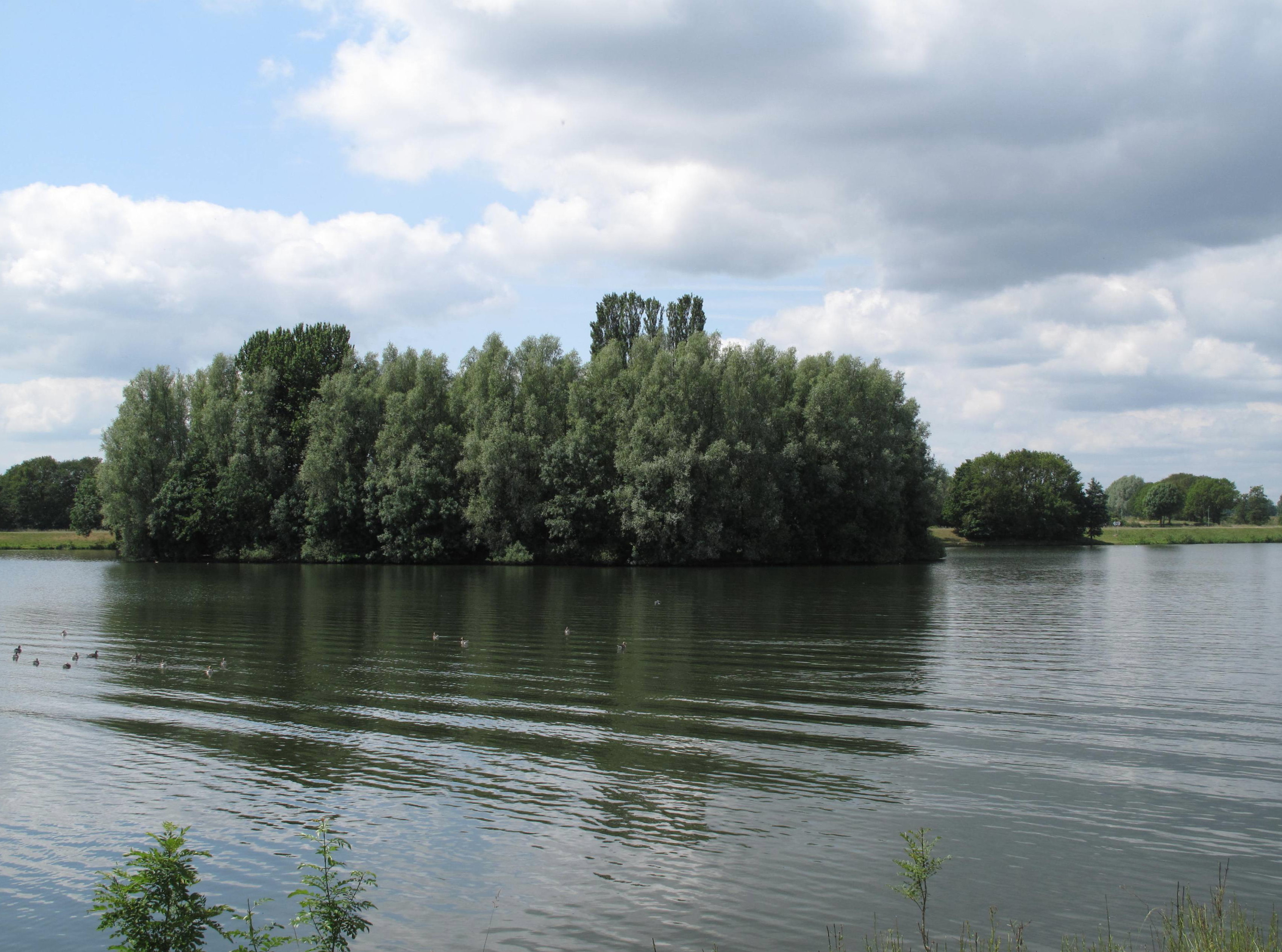
Mookerplas

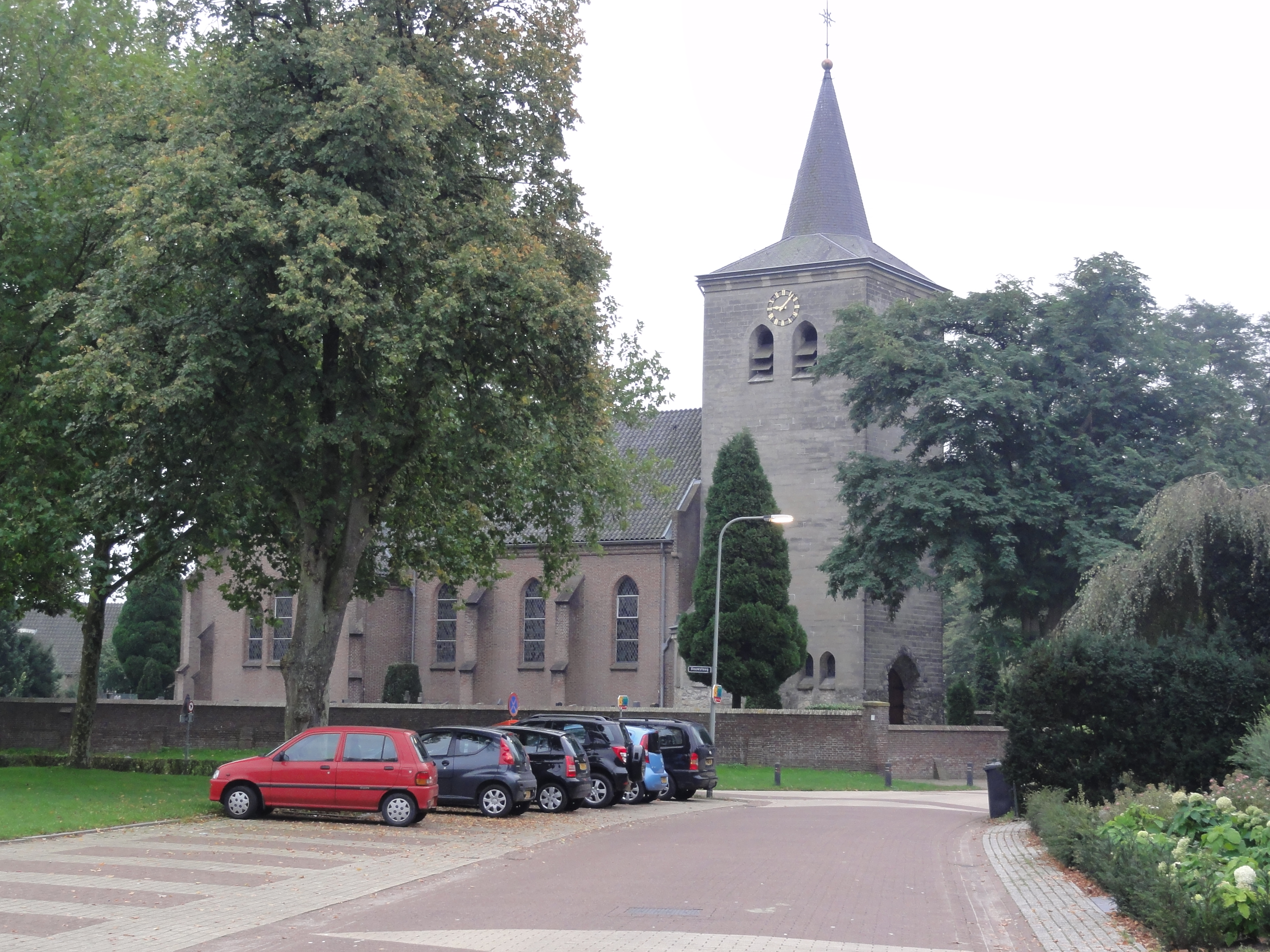
Middelaar, church

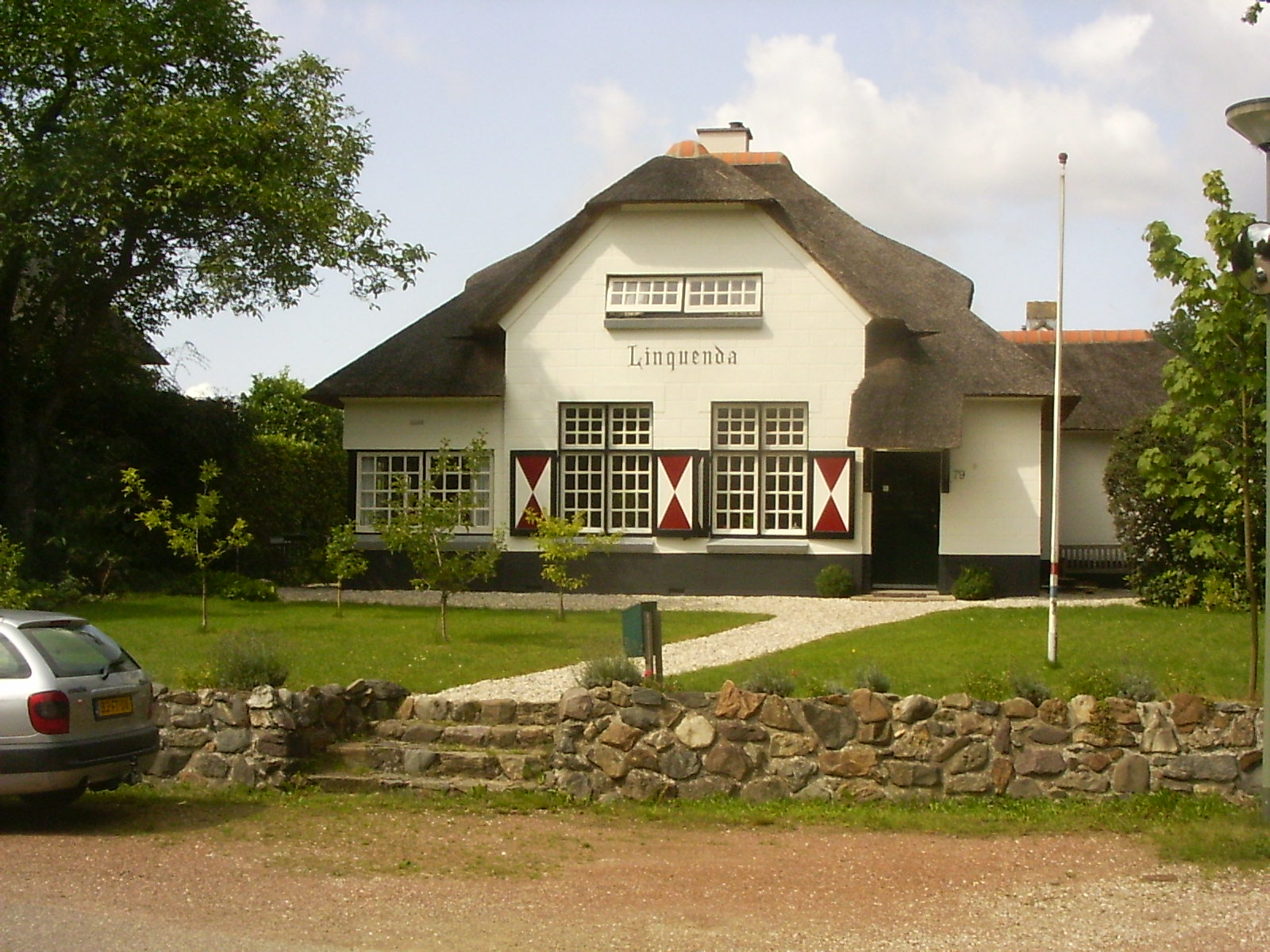
Molenhoek-stationsstraat

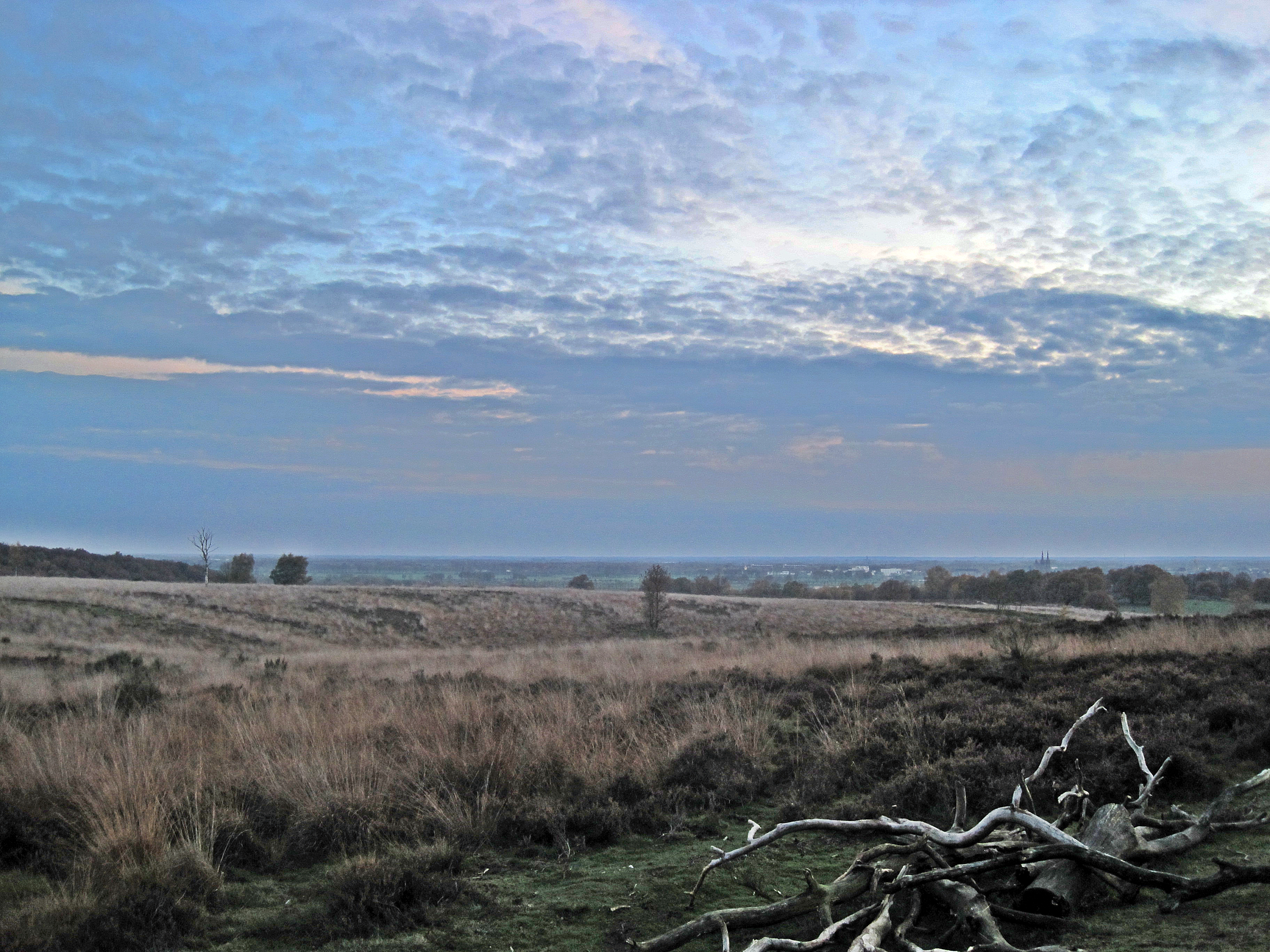
Mookerheide near Mook

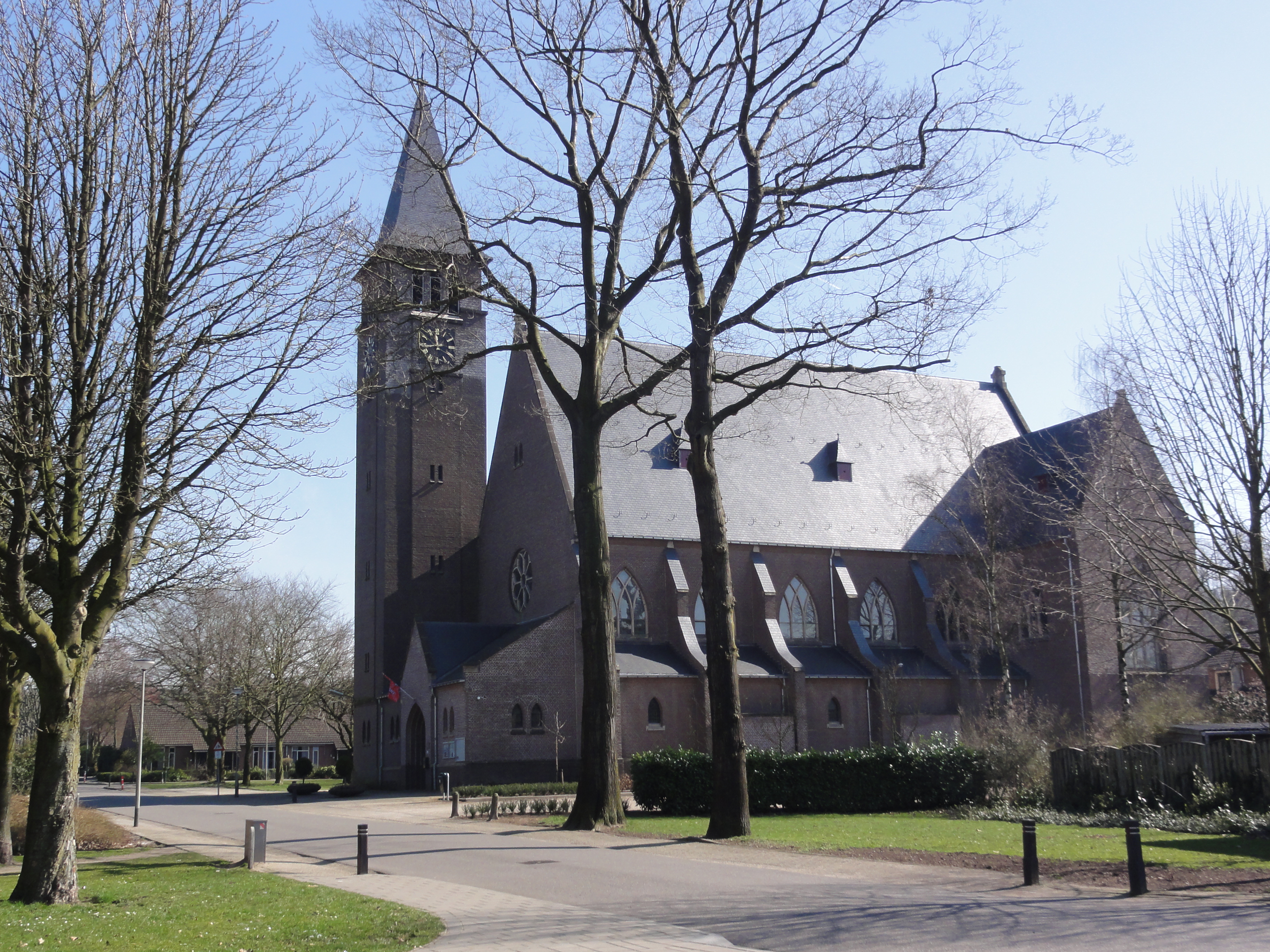
Molenhoek church, Mook en Middelaar

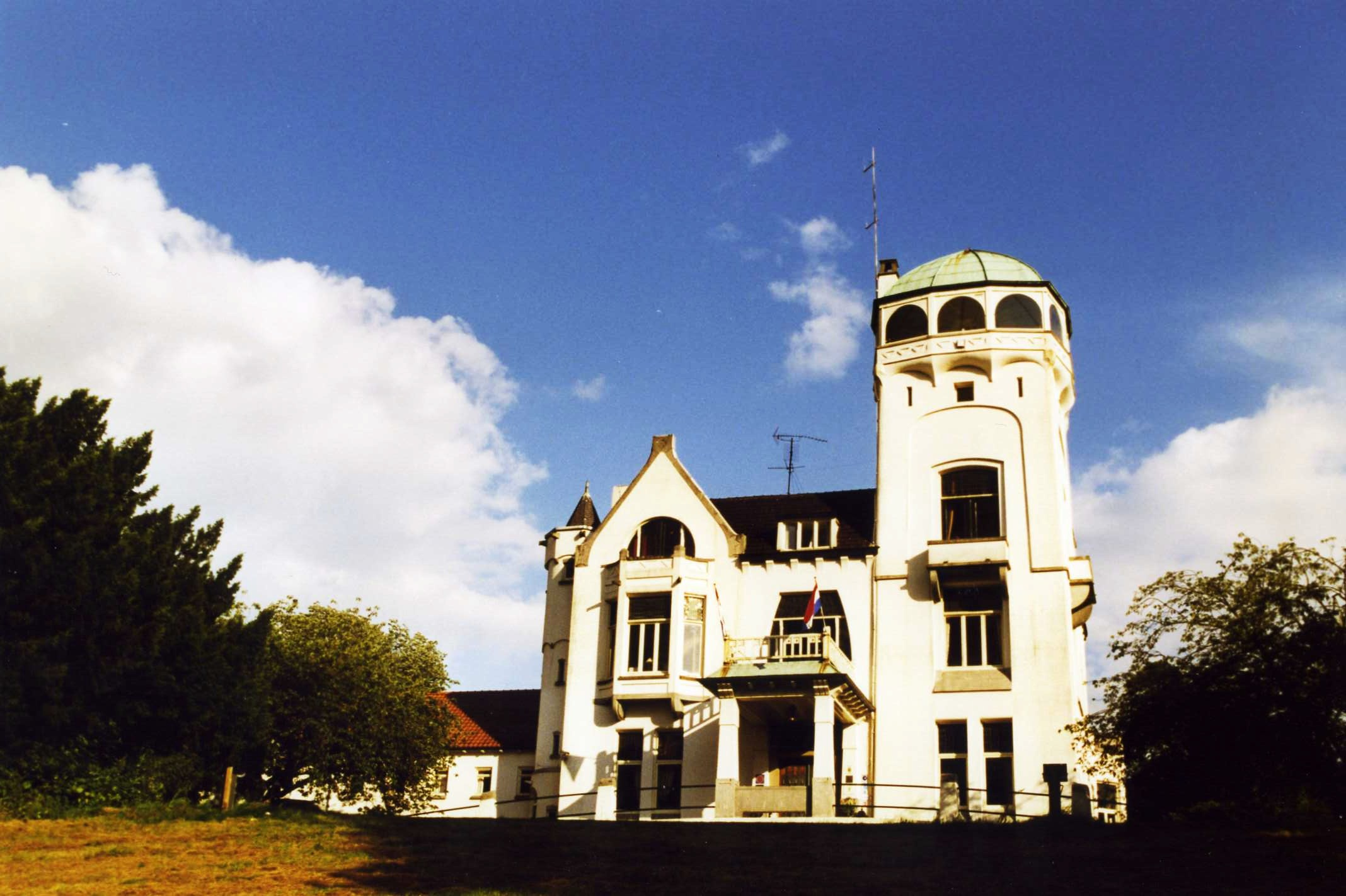
Mookerheide
