= William Klersy =

Canadian flying ace of WWII

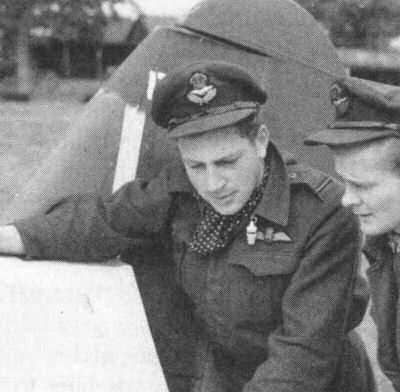
- Klersy, holding map, with another pilot
- Born: 30 July 1922; Brantford, Ontario, Canada
- Died: 22 May 1945 (aged 22); The Netherlands
- Burial place: Groesbeek Canadian War Cemetery, The Netherlands
- Military career
- Allegiance: Canada
- Branch: Royal Canadian Air Force
- Rank: Squadron leader
- Nickname: 'Grizzly'
- Service number: J/12199
- Commands: No. 401 Squadron
- Conflicts: Second World War: Circus offensive; Invasion of Normandy; Western Allied invasion of Germany
- Awards: Distinguished Service Order; Distinguished Flying Cross & Bar

William Thomas Klersy, DSO, DFC & Bar (30 July 1922 – 22 May 1945) was a Canadian flying ace who served in the Royal Canadian Air Force (RCAF) during the Second World War. During his service with the RCAF, he was credited with at least fifteen aerial victories.

Born in Brantford, Klersy joined the RCAF in 1941. After serving with No. 130 Squadron in Canada, he was sent to the United Kingdom in June 1943. Posted to No. 401 Squadron, he achieved a number of aerial victories and was awarded the Distinguished Flying Cross (DFC) before going to a staff posting with No. 83 Group in September 1944. Subsequently, awarded a Bar to his DFC, he returned to operational duties in early 1945 with a posting back to No. 401 Squadron as its commander, leading the unit as it supported the Allied advance into Germany. He was killed in a flying accident in The Netherlands on 22 May 1945. He was posthumously awarded the Distinguished Service Order (DSO).

== Early life ==
William Thomas Klersy was born on 30 July 1922 in Brantford in Ontario, Canada, the only son of William Klersy, of Toronto, and his wife Grace. Educated at St. Michael's College School, he joined the Royal Canadian Air Force (RCAF) in June 1941, shortly before he turned 19, and was allocated the service number J/12199.

== Second World War ==
Nicknamed 'Grizzly', Klersy gained his wings at No. 6 Service Flying Training School, located in Dunnville, in July 1942. He was then posted to No. 130 Squadron, based at Bagotville, as a pilot officer. In mid-1943, he was sent to the United Kingdom to serve in the war effort and was promptly posted to No. 401 Squadron.

=== Service with No. 401 Squadron ===
Klersy's new unit was equipped with Supermarine Spitfire Mk Vb fighters and based at Redhill. At the time of Klersy's arrival, the squadron was engaged in bomber escort duties but was soon attached to No. 83 Group, as part of the 2nd Tactical Air Force. It began to train in ground support operations; having received Spitfire Mk IXs in October, was increasingly engaged in what were known as Ramrod and Rodeo missions; bomber escort and fighter sweeps respectively.

On 7 March 1944, while flying on a sortie over France, Klersy destroyed a Focke-Wulf Fw 190 fighter. By this time, the squadron's operations were in support of the impending Operation Overlord, the invasion of Normandy. On D-Day and over the following days, it helped patrol the landing beaches. Although the squadron saw little Luftwaffe activity on D-Day itself, the following day, 7 June, flying to the north west of Caen, Klersy shot down a Fw 190 that was flying as a fighter-bomber. Later in the month, the squadron began operating from a landing strip at Bény-sur-Mer in the Normandy beachhead and with patrols engaged in ground support operations. On 28 June Klersy destroyed a pair of Fw 190s east of Domfront and while flying in the area around Caen, he shot down a Messerschmitt Bf 109 fighter on 2 July. He engaged and damaged a FW 190 on 13 July and four days later shot down a Dornier Do 217 medium bomber north of Caen. On the last day of July he destroyed a Fw 190.

His successes saw Klersy awarded the Distinguished Flying Cross (DFC). The official announcement was made in early September 1944 and the citation, published in The London Gazette, read

This officer has displayed the greatest keenness for operations. He has participated in a large number of sorties, on many of which he has led the flight with distinction. He is a most determined fighter and has shot down three enemy aircraft.

— London Gazette, No. 36686, 5 September 1944

Klersy was rested partway through September and sent to serve on the staff at the headquarters of No. 83 Group. On 1 December 1944, the announcement of an award of a Bar to his DFC was made. The published citation read

This officer is a keen and courageous fighter. He has completed a large number of sorties and his successes include the destruction of 7 enemy aircraft and many mechanical vehicles. His example of determination and devotion to duty has been of a high order.

— London Gazette, No. 36820, 1 December 1944

=== Squadron leader ===
In early January 1945, Klersy returned to operations with a posting back to No. 401 Squadron, this time as its commander, having been promoted to squadron leader. His predecessor had been shot down behind German lines. The squadron was based at Heesch in The Netherlands. Poor weather inhibited operations but on 23 January, Klersy encountered and damaged an Arado Ar 234 jet bomber near Osnabrück. By late February, conditions had improved and Klersy's unit was regularly flying sorties. He destroyed two Bf 109s over Dorsten on 1 March, and was also credited with shooting down a Fw 190 the same day. On 19 April, with the Allied advance into Germany well underway, Klersy shot down a Fw 190 he intercepted while on patrol over Hagenow. The following day, the squadron caught several German fighters taking off from Schwerin Airfield. Klersy destroyed a Bf 109 and shared in the destruction of another. Flying another sortie later in the day, No. 401 Squadron strafed Hagenow Airfield and Klersy destroyed two Fw 190s. His squadron destroyed a total of 18 German aircraft during the course of the day.

On 1 May, while patrolling around the Schwerin Lake area, Klersy damaged a Fw 190 over Lübeck Airfield. Two days, leading the squadron in a patrol over northern Germany, several aircraft were spotted on a grass airstrip at Schonberg. Strafing the airstrip, he destroyed a Junkers Ju 52 transport aircraft and a Heinkel He 111 medium bomber. Several other aircraft were destroyed by the remaining pilots of the squadron. On 22 May, he was leading a section of Spitfires to The Netherlands, having taken off from Tangmere. The aircraft encountered cloud cover over the Netherlands and Klersy became separated from the others and crashed. His body was found two days later, still in the wreckage of his Spitfire. A month after his death, it was announced that he was awarded the Distinguished Service Order in "recognition of gallantry and devotion to duty in the execution of air operations".

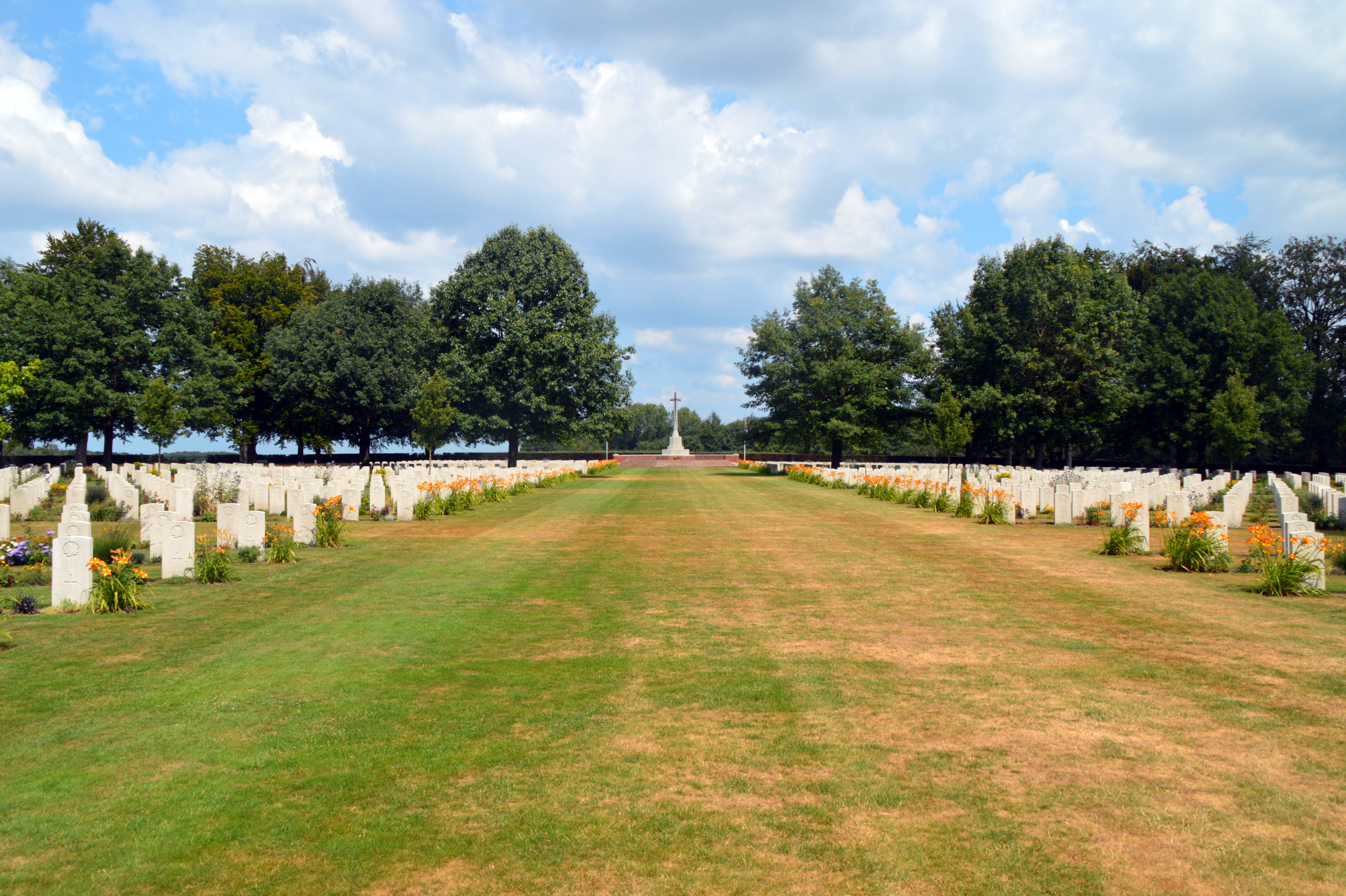
Klersy is buried in the Groesbeek Canadian War Cemetery, in The Netherlands

Buried at the Groesbeek Canadian War Cemetery in The Netherlands, Klersy is credited with having shot down fifteen German aircraft, one of which shared with another pilot. He is also credited with damaging three aircraft and destroying two on the ground. The lounge at the No. 401 Squadron base at Cold Lake in Alberta is named for him.
