= Plasmolen =

- Village
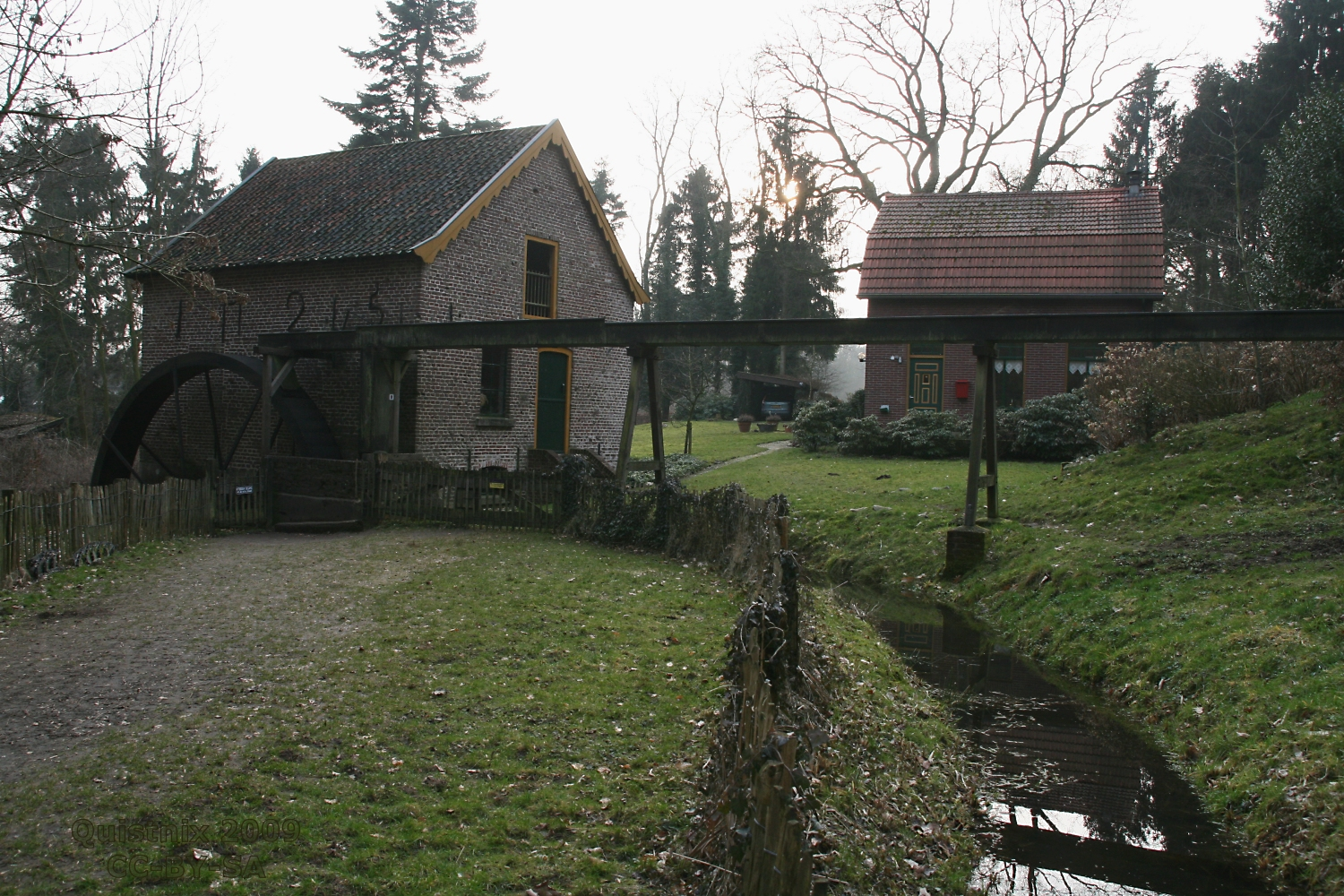
- The 'Bovenste Plasmolen' watermill

- Location in the Netherlands Location in the province of Limburg in the Netherlands
- Coordinates: 51°44′58″N 5°55′26″E
- Country: Netherlands
- Province: Limburg
- Municipality: Mook en Middelaar

Area
  - Total: 4.04 km^{2} (1.56 sq mi)
- Elevation: 21 m (69 ft)

Population (2021)
  - Total: 310
  - Density: 77/km^{2} (200/sq mi)
- Time zone: UTC+1 (CET)
  - Summer (DST): UTC+2 (CEST)
- Postal code: 6586
- Dialing code: 024

Plasmolen (Limburgish: De Plasmeule) is a village in the municipality of Mook en Middelaar, in the province of Limburg in the Netherlands. It is situated between the Meuse (river) and the Municipality Groesbeek. The town is situated in a moraine landscape, the St. Jansberg is an example of this.

The "St. Jansberg" is a unique hiking area, located on the moraine. The area covers approximately 250 hectares and is owned by Natuurmonumenten. The Pieterpad runs through this area.

The 'Bovenste Plasmolen', a watermill dating from 1725, but probably older and the remains of the largest Roman villa ever found in the Netherlands are in this area. The villa was discovered in 1931 and is probably from the 2nd century AD.
