= Mook War Cemetery =

CWGC cemetery in Netherlands

- Commonwealth War Graves Commission
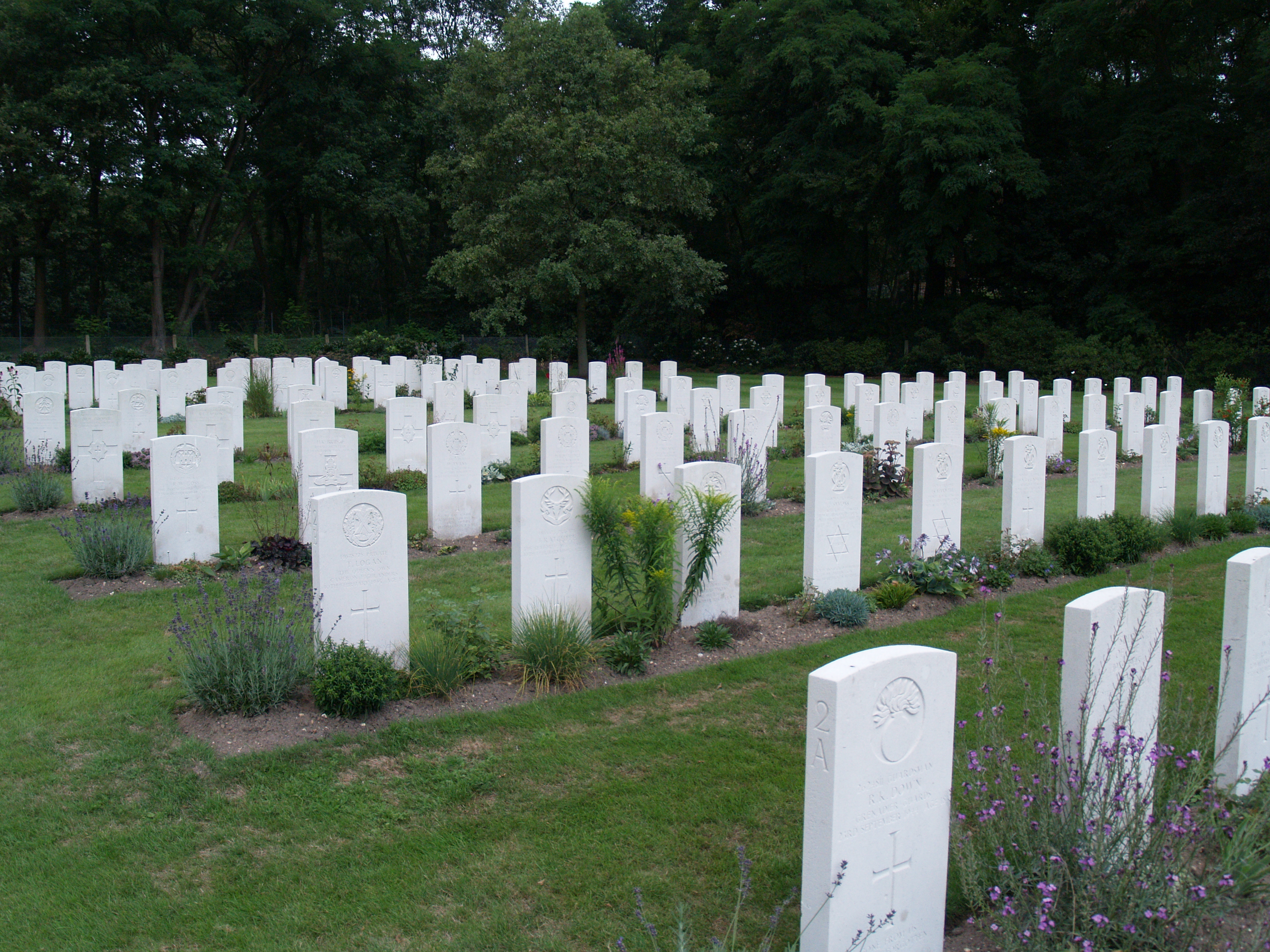
- Mook War Cemetery graves
- Used for those deceased 1944–1945
- Established: spring 1945
- Location: 51°45′14″N 05°53′10″E near Nijmegen, Netherlands.
- Total burials: 322
- Unknowns: 15

Burials by nation
- United Kingdom: 297; Poland: 11; Canada: 10; Australia: 3 New Zealand: 1

Burials by war
- World War II

Mook War Cemetery is the final resting place of 322 soldiers killed in the Second World War, situated in the Dutch municipality of Mook en Middelaar. The Commonwealth War Graves Commission is responsible for the cemetery.

It features a Cross of Sacrifice at the cemetery entrance made of Portland stone, with a metal sword. A register and a guest book are present.

The 322 burials are from the following countries:

- United Kingdom – 297
- Poland – 11
- Canada – 10
- Australia – 3
- New Zealand – 1

== Nearby Commonwealth War Graves ==
- Groesbeek Canadian War Cemetery
- Jonkerbos War Cemetery
- Arnhem Oosterbeek War Cemetery
