= Queen Margaret's School =

Coordinates: 48.7843°N 123.7202°W

Location
- 660 Brownsey Ave; Duncan, British Columbia, V9L 1C2

Information
- School type: Independent Day & Boarding
- Motto: Servite Fortiter (Serve Ye Bravely)
- Established: April 4, 1921
- School board: QMS Board of Governors
- Head of School: Mr. Ander Monro
- Staff: 165+
- Grades: ECE (Preschool/Junior Kindergarten)–Grade 12
- Enrollment: 525+
- Language: English
- Area: 30 acres
- Colours: Green, Red & Gold
- Team name: The Royals
- Affiliation: CAIS, ISABC, FISA
- Website: qms.bc.ca
- Last updated: March 7, 2024

Queen Margaret's School is a Canadian school in Duncan, British Columbia, in the Cowichan Valley on Vancouver Island. It has over 525 students in its ECE, Junior and Senior School. It also features a unique equestrian marquee program—the only of its kind in Canada.

== Alumni ==
- Susanna Blunt, artist
- Hon. Ione Christensen, senator
- Charles Ferguson Hoey, Victoria Cross recipient

== Affiliations ==
- Canadian Association of Independent Schools
- National Association of Independent Schools
