= William Basil Weston =

Recipient of the Victoria Cross

William Basil Weston VC
- Born: 3 January 1924; Ulverston, Lancashire, England
- Died: 3 March 1945 (aged 21); Meiktila, British Burma
- Burial place: Taukkyan War Cemetery
- Military career
- Allegiance: United Kingdom
- Branch: British Army
- Service years: 1942 – 1945
- Rank: Lieutenant
- Units: Green Howards; West Yorkshire Regiment (attached)
- Conflicts: World War II: Pacific War; Burma campaign; Burma campaign 1945; Central Burma campaign; Capture of Meiktila †
- Awards: Victoria Cross

William Basil Weston VC (3 January 1924 – 3 March 1945) was an English recipient of the Victoria Cross, the highest and most prestigious award for gallantry in the face of the enemy that can be awarded to British and Commonwealth forces.

== Details ==
Weston was 21 years old, and a lieutenant in the Green Howards (Alexandra, Princess of Wales's Own Yorkshire Regiment), British Army, attached to 1st Battalion, West Yorkshire Regiment during the Second World War when the following deed took place for which he was awarded the VC.

On 3 March 1945 during the attack on Meiktila, Burma, Lieutenant Weston was commanding a platoon which, together with the rest of the company, had to clear an area of the town of the enemy. In the face of fanatical opposition he led his men superbly, encouraging them from one bunker position to the next. When he came to the last, particularly well-defended bunker, he fell wounded in the entrance. Knowing that his men would not be able to capture the position without heavy casualties he pulled the pin out of one of his grenades as he lay on the ground and deliberately blew himself up with the occupants of the bunker.

== Victoria Cross medal ==
William Basil Weston's medal was placed on permanent loan at the Green Howards Museum at Richmond in 2001 by his nephew, Basil Weston of Ulverston.
