= Bryan Draper =

British flying ace

- Born: 1916; Barry, South Wales
- Died: 28 February 1945 (aged 28)
- Military career
- Allegiance: United Kingdom
- Branch: Royal Air Force Volunteer Reserve
- Rank: Squadron Leader
- Units: No. 45 Squadron; No. 74 Squadron
- Conflicts: Second World War: Battle of France; Battle of Britain; Burma campaign
- Awards: Distinguished Flying Cross

Bryan Vincent Draper DFC (1916 – 28 February 1945) was a British flying ace of the Royal Air Force Volunteer Reserve (RAFVR) during the Second World War. He was credited with at least six aerial victories.

From Barry in South Wales, Draper joined the RAFVR in 1938. Called up for service on the outbreak of the Second World War, he was posted to No. 74 Squadron in early 1940 and flew in the Battle of France and the subsequent Battle of Britain during which he destroyed a number of aircraft. He performed instructing duties for much of the remainder of the war but returned to operational duty with a posting in January 1945 to No. 45 Squadron, serving in India. He was killed on 28 February 1945 when his de Havilland Mosquito broke up in midair.

== Early life ==
Born in Barry, South Wales in early 1916, Bryan Vincent Draper was the son of John Draper and his wife Nellie. Educated at Whitgift School in Croydon in London, he joined the Royal Air Force Volunteer Reserve in April 1938. Late the following year, he gained his pilot's wings.

== Second World War ==
As a serving member of the Royal Air Force Volunteer Reserve, Draper was called up for service soon after the outbreak of the Second World War. He was commissioned as a probationary pilot officer on 10 December 1939 in the General Duties Branch. After a period of training at St. Athan, learning to fly the Supermarine Spitfire fighter, he was posted to No. 74 Squadron, based at Rochford, in February 1940. He saw little action until his unit provided cover during Operation Dynamo, the evacuation of the British Expeditionary Force from Dunkirk. On 24 May, he was one of several pilots who combined to destroy a Dornier Do 17 medium bomber near Calais.

=== Battle of Britain ===
Following the conclusion of Operation Dynamo, the squadron flew in the Battle of Britain. On 10 July Draper damaged a Messerschmitt Bf 109 fighter and then a Do 17 in a separate sortie later in the day. The squadron shifted to No. 12 Group in mid-August, operating from Wittering in Cambridgeshire but shifted to Coltishall the next month and was heavily engaged in intercepting the Luftwaffe's bombing raids on London. On 14 September, after an unsuccessful engagement with a Messerschmitt Bf 110 heavy fighter, he shot down a Junkers Ju 88 medium bomber near Yarmouth 20 minutes later. At the end of the month he reported engaging another Ju 88 over the English Channel, scoring several hits on the bomber.

In October, No. 74 Squadron began operating from the RAF station at Biggin Hill in Kent. On the 17th of that month, during an encounter over Gravesend, he shot down a Bf 109, the pilot of which was made a prisoner of war, and had another of the same type reported as probably destroyed. Three days later he probably destroyed a further Bf 109 near Maidstone. He had to crash land near Sevenoaks as a result of the encounter, his Spitfire having received gunfire to its engine during the dogfight over south London. On 14 November, when he and his section intercepted a formation of Junkers Ju 87 dive bombers over Deal, he shot down three of them. He also reported damaging a Bf 109. The next day, he destroyed another Bf 109 over Littlehampton.

In December, Draper, having been promoted to flying officer, was posted to RAF Upavon to attend an instructing course at the Central Flying School there. The same month, his award of the Distinguished Flying Cross was announced. The citation, published in The London Gazette, read:

Since December, 1939, Pilot Officer Draper has participated in numerous engagements against the enemy. He has shown great skill and determination as a fighter pilot and has destroyed seven enemy aircraft.

— The London Gazette, No. 35022, 24 December 1940.

=== Far East ===
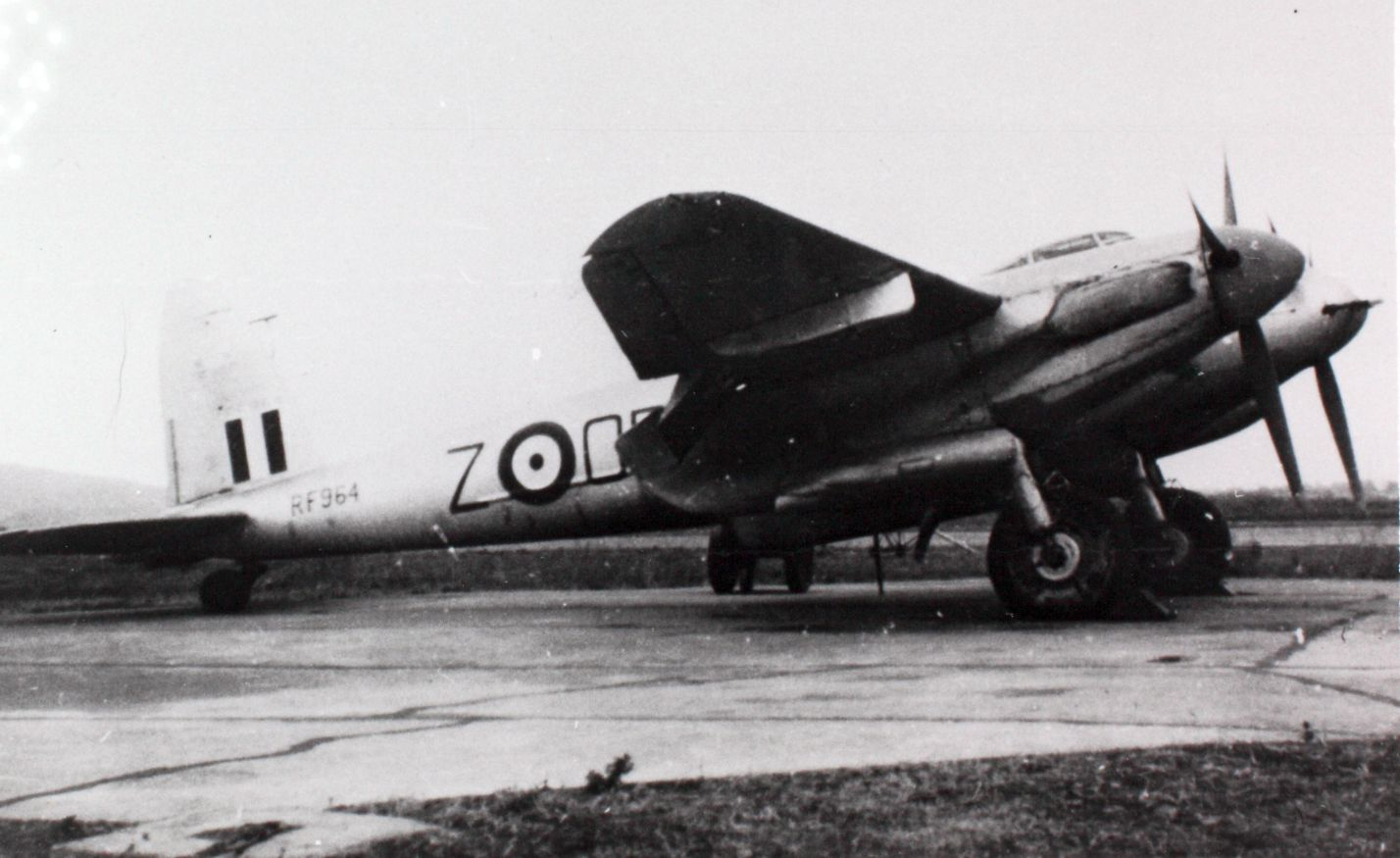
A Mosquito of No. 45 Squadron, 1944–45

Once his training course was completed, Draper performed instructing duties at the Royal Air Force College near Cranwell. Promoted to flight lieutenant in March 1942, he then spent a period of time in Canada, also as an instructor. He returned to England in December 1943 and went on a conversion course to learn how to fly the de Havilland Mosquito twin-engined fighter-bomber. At the start of 1945, he returned to operational duty, with a posting to No. 45 Squadron, at the time based in India. His new unit was tasked with carrying out ground attack missions on Japanese facilities during the campaign in Burma. While flying one such mission, on 28 February 1945, his aircraft broke up in midair and he and his navigator were killed.

== Death and legacy ==
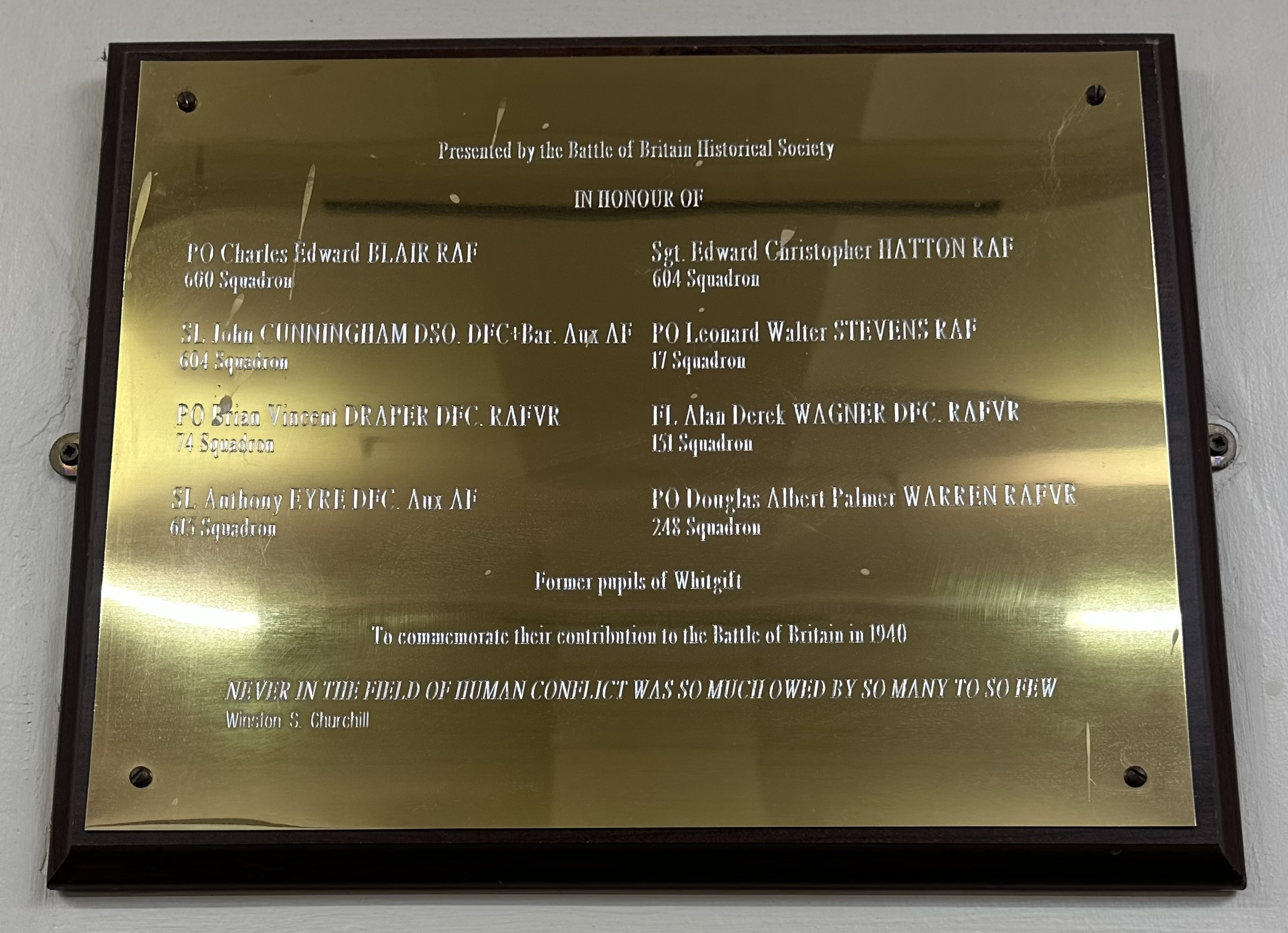
Plaque memorial with Draper's name, at Whitgift School, South Croydon

Survived by his wife, at the time of his death, Draper held the rank of squadron leader and was credited with having shot down six aircraft, with a share in another aircraft destroyed. He is also credited with two aircraft probably destroyed and three more damaged. He is buried at Taukkyan War Cemetery in Rangoon, Myanmar. He is listed on a memorial plaque in honour of former Whitgift School pupils who were Battle of Britain pilots; the plaque was unveiled at the school in 2006.
