= Royal Lincolnshire Regiment =

Earl of Bath's Regiment 10th Regiment of Foot Lincolnshire Regiment Royal Lincolnshire Regiment
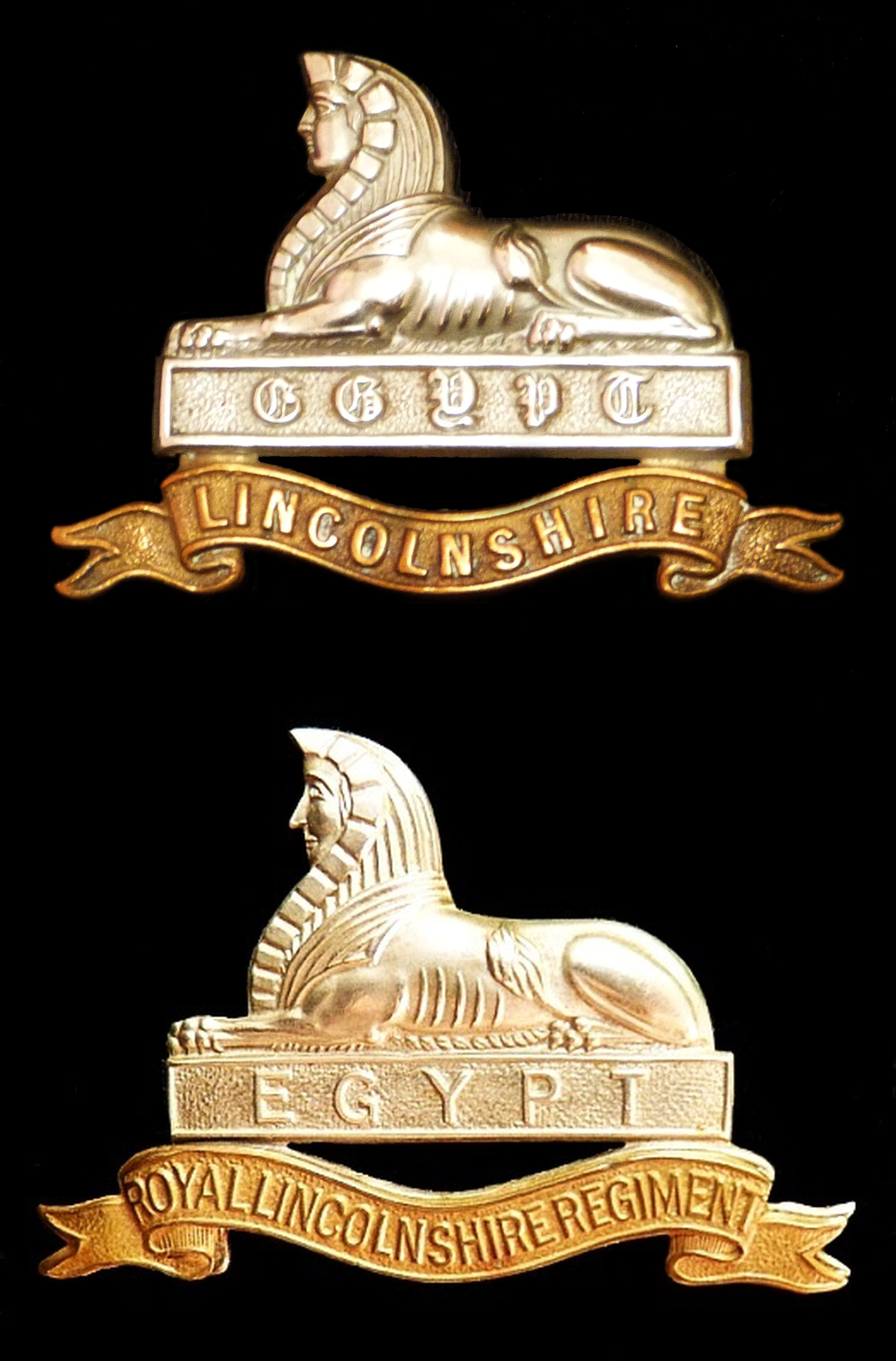
- Lincolnshire Regiment and Royal Lincolnshire Regiment cap badges
- Active: 1685–1960
- Country: Kingdom of England (1685–1707); Kingdom of Great Britain (1707–1800); United Kingdom (1801–1960)
- Branch: British Army
- Type: Line infantry
- Role: Infantry
- Size: Varied
- Garrison/HQ: The Old Barracks, Lincoln (1873–1880); Sobraon Barracks, Lincoln (1880–1960)
- Nicknames: "The Yellow Bellies" "the Springers"
- Engagements: Nine Years' War; War of the Spanish Succession; Battle of Blenheim; Battle of Ramillies; Battle of Malplaquet; American War of Independence; Battles of Lexington and Concord; Battle of Bunker Hill; New York and New Jersey campaign; Battle of Germantown; Battle of Monmouth; Battle of Rhode Island; French Revolutionary Wars; Battle of Alexandria; Napoleonic Wars; Walcheren Campaign; Peninsular War; Battle of Castalla; Siege of Tarragona; First Anglo-Sikh War; Battle of Sobraon; Perak War; Mahdist War; Battle of Omdurman; Second Boer War; First World War; Second World War; Malayan Emergency

The Royal Lincolnshire Regiment was a line infantry regiment of the British Army raised on 20 June 1685 as the Earl of Bath's Regiment for its first Colonel, John Granville, 1st Earl of Bath. In 1751, it was numbered like most other Army regiments and named the 10th Regiment of Foot. After the Childers Reforms of 1881, it became the Lincolnshire Regiment after the county where it had been recruiting since 1781.

After the Second World War, it became the Royal Lincolnshire Regiment, before being amalgamated in 1960 with the Northamptonshire Regiment to form the 2nd East Anglian Regiment (Duchess of Gloucester's Own Royal Lincolnshire and Northamptonshire) which was later amalgamated with the 1st East Anglian Regiment (Royal Norfolk and Suffolk), 3rd East Anglian Regiment (16th/44th Foot) and the Royal Leicestershire Regiment to form the Royal Anglian Regiment. 'A' Company of the 2nd Battalion of the Royal Anglians continues the traditions of the Royal Lincolnshire Regiment.

== History ==
=== Early wars ===
The regiment was raised on 20 June 1685 as the Earl of Bath's Regiment for its first Colonel, John Granville, 1st Earl of Bath. Prior to the Glorious Revolution, it formed the garrison of Plymouth and defected to William III shortly after his landing at Torbay on 5 November 1688. After the outbreak of the Nine Years War in 1689, the regiment remained in Plymouth until the end of 1691, when it embarked for Ostend and saw action at the Battle of Steenkerque in August 1692, suffering 50 dead or wounded. During the 1693 campaign, it was detached from the main Allied force prior to the Battle of Landen in July, then served at the Siege of Namur in July 1695 before returning to England in 1696. It escaped disbandment in 1698 by being posted to Ireland.

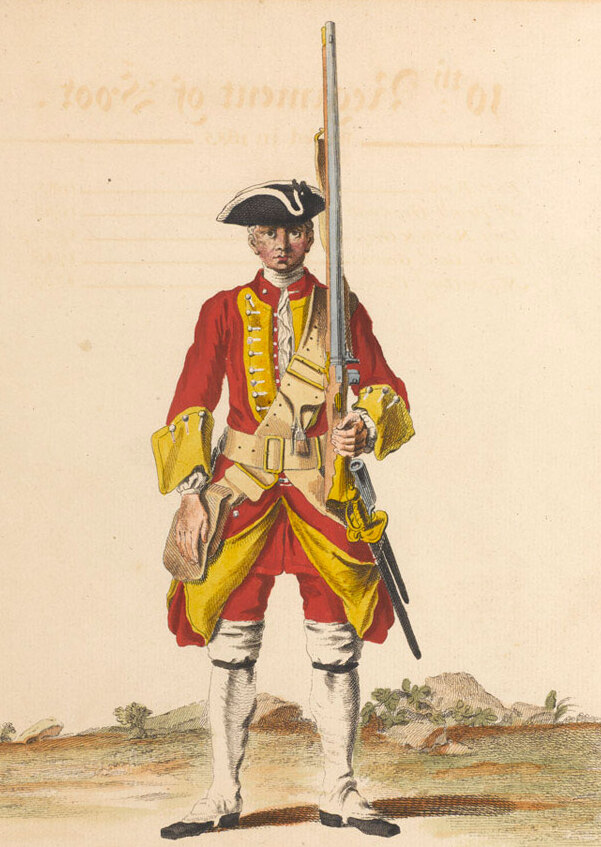
c. 1742 engraving of a regimental private

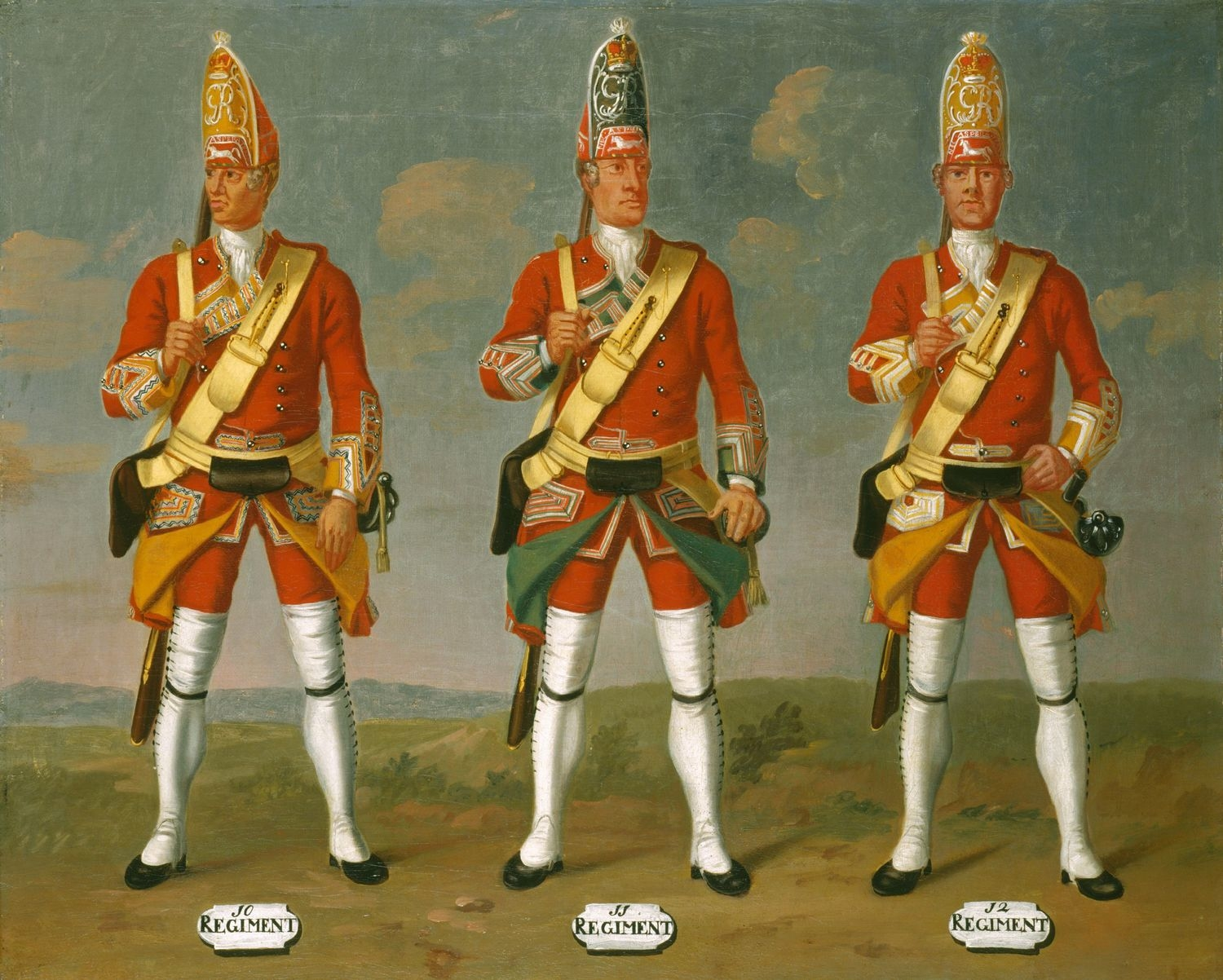
c. 1751 painting of a regimental grenadier (left)

During the 1701 to 1714 War of the Spanish Succession, the regiment fought at Blenheim in August 1704, Ramillies in May 1706, and Malplaquet in September 1709. Following the 1751 reforms, when all British regiments were identified by numbers rather than their Colonel's name, it became the 10th Regiment of Foot. It then took part in the 1759–60 action to repel Thurot at Carrickfergus during the Seven Years' War.

1781 portrait of a regimental light company captain

The regiment would next see action in the American Revolutionary War, fighting at the Battles of Lexington and Concord in April 1775, the Battle of Bunker Hill in June 1775, the New York Campaign in winter 1776, the Battle of Germantown in October 1777, the Battle of Monmouth in June 1778 and the Battle of Rhode Island in August 1778. In 1778, the 10th returned home to England after 19 years of service overseas. In 1782, the regiment was linked to the county of Lincolnshire for recruiting.

=== French Revolutionary and Napoleonic Wars ===
The regiment embarked for Egypt in 1800 for service in the French Revolutionary Wars, arriving too late to take part in the Battle of Alexandria in March 1801 but being encamped at Al Hamed at the surrender of the city in September. The 2nd battalion then took part in the disastrous Walcheren Campaign in the autumn 1809. Meanwhile, the 1st battalion embarked for Spain in 1812 for service in the Peninsular War and took part in the Battle of Castalla in April 1813 and the Siege of Tarragona in June 1813.

Lieutenant-Colonel Henry Booth, KH, JP, a Peninsular War veteran and the last of his ancient family to be seated at Killingholme, served as commanding officer from 1830 until his death in 1841.

=== The Victorian era ===
In 1842, the 10th Foot was sent to India and was involved in the bloody Battle of Sobraon in February 1846 during the First Anglo-Sikh War. The 10th would also see action at the Relief of Multan in January 1849 and the Battle of Gujrat in February 1849 during the Second Anglo-Sikh War. In 1857, at the outbreak of the Indian Rebellion, the Regiment was stationed at Dinapore, taking part in the failed first relief of the Siege of Arrah and going on to play an important role in the relief of Lucknow where Private Denis Dempsey won the Victoria Cross.

The 1st Battalion, 10th Foot served in Japan from 1868 through 1871. The battalion was charged with protecting the small foreign community in Yokohama. The leader of the battalion's military band, John William Fenton, is honoured in Japan as "the first bandmaster in Japan" and as "the father of band music in Japan". He is also credited for initiating the slow process in which Kimi ga Yo came to be accepted as the national anthem of Japan.

The regiment was not fundamentally affected by the Cardwell Reforms of the 1870s, which gave it a depot at the "old barracks" in Lincoln from 1873. The regiment moved to the "new barracks" further north on Burton Road in 1880. Nor was the regiment affected by the Childers reforms of 1881 – as it already possessed two battalions, there was no need for it to amalgamate with another regiment. Under the reforms, the regiment became The Lincolnshire Regiment on 1 July 1881.

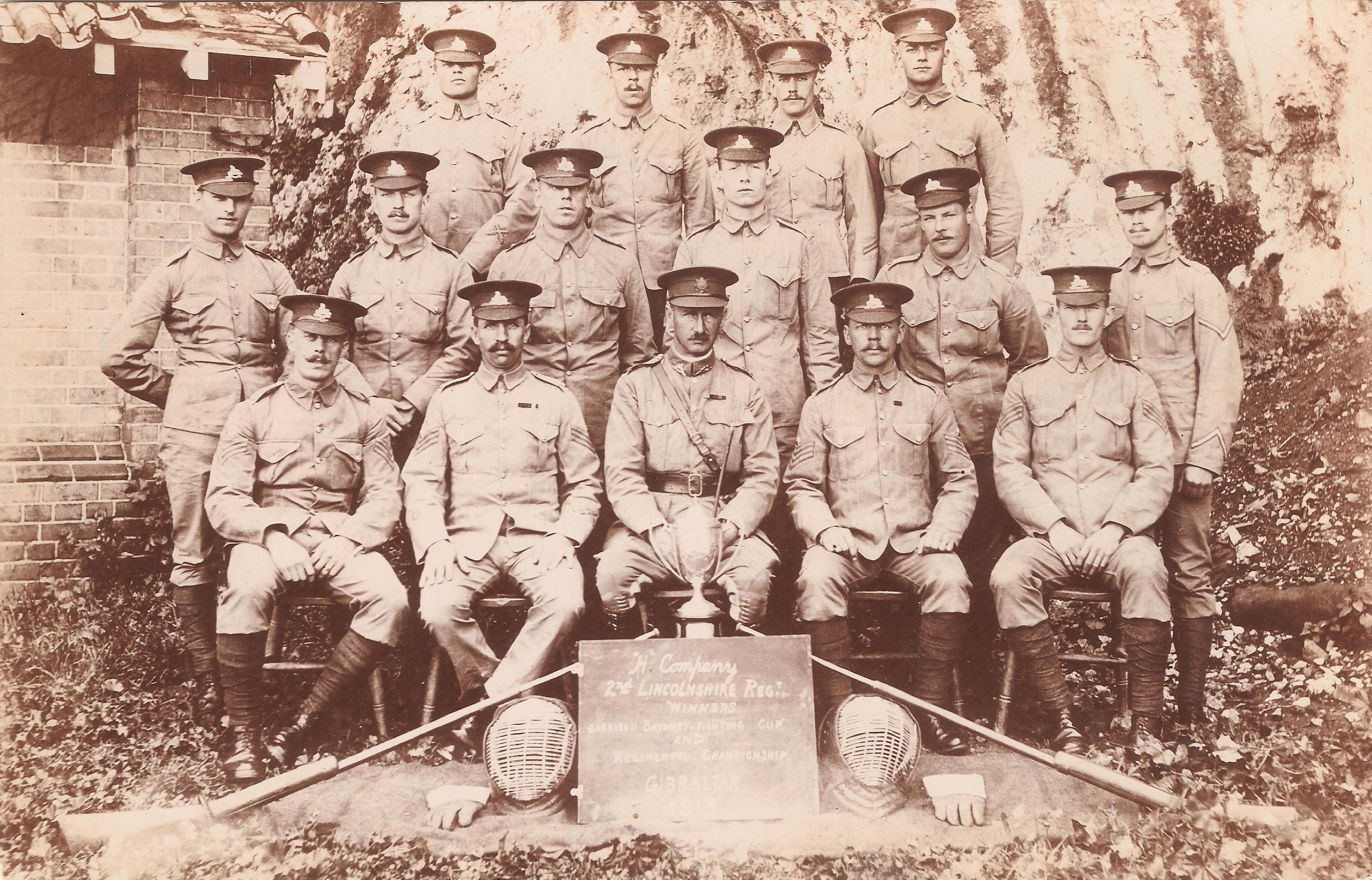
Bayonet team of "H" Company, 2nd Battalion, Lincolnshire Regiment in the Imperial fortress colony of Gibraltar in 1913

The Royal North Lincolnshire and Royal South Lincolnshire Militia regiments became the 3rd and 4th Battalions, and the 1st and 2nd Lincolnshire Rifle Volunteer Corps became the 1st and 2nd Volunteer Battalions (a 3rd Volunteer Battalion was added in 1900). The 1st Battalion Lincolnshire Regiment was posted at Malta from 1895, and took part in the Battle of Omdurman in September 1898 during the Mahdist War. It was then stationed in British India, where it was in Bangalore until late 1902 when it transferred to Secunderabad. The 2nd Battalion embarked for South Africa in January 1900 and saw action during the Second Boer War.

The 3rd (Militia) battalion, formed from the Royal North Lincoln Militia in 1881, was a reserve battalion. It was embodied in May 1900, disembodied in July the following year, and later re-embodied for service in South Africa during the Second Boer War. 17 officers and 519 men returned aboard Cestrian, arriving in Southampton on 5 October 1902.

In 1908, the Volunteers and Militia were reorganised under the Haldane Reforms, with the former becoming the Territorial Force (TF) and the latter the Special Reserve; the regiment now had one Reserve and two Territorial battalions. These were the 3rd Battalion (Special Reserve) at Lincoln, with the 4th Battalion (TF) at Broadgate in Lincoln and the 5th Battalion (TF) at Doughty Road in Grimsby (since demolished).

When film director James Gordon, who had been involved in filming the Edison Studios' 1912 films The Relief of Lucknow and For Valour in Bermuda using military sites as locations and soldiers of the 2nd Battalion of the Queen's (Royal West Surrey) Regiment as extras, returned to Bermuda in 1914 with Victory Photoplay Company to film The Viking and The Mystery of the Poison Pool, both starring Betty Harte, soldiers from the 2nd Battalion of the Lincolnshire Regiment, which had replaced the 2nd Battalion of the Queen's in January 1914, provided soldiers as extras for the first film.

=== First World War ===
The regiment started the First World War with two regular battalions, one militia battalion and two territorial battalions. The 1st Lincolns were stationed in Portsmouth, the 2nd Lincolns on Garrison in Bermuda, and the 3rd in Lincoln. The 4th and 5th Battalions were the Territorial battalions, based throughout Lincolnshire.

==== Regular Army ====
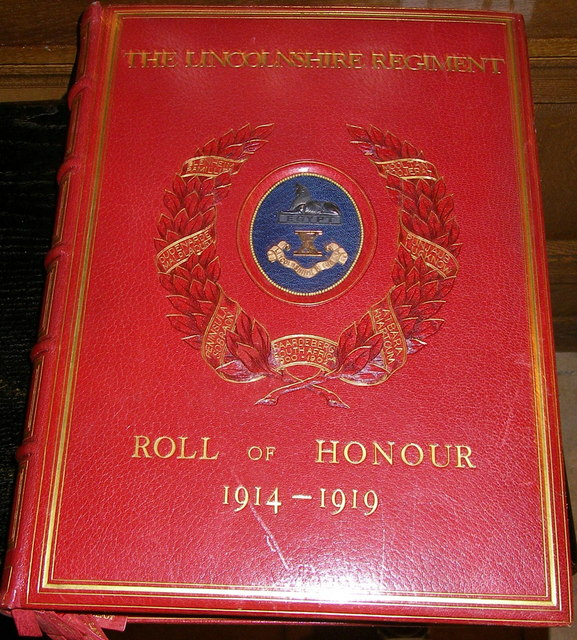
The Roll of Honour 1914–1919 contains over 8000 names of men. It is displayed in a wooden case in the Services Chapel of Lincoln Cathedral

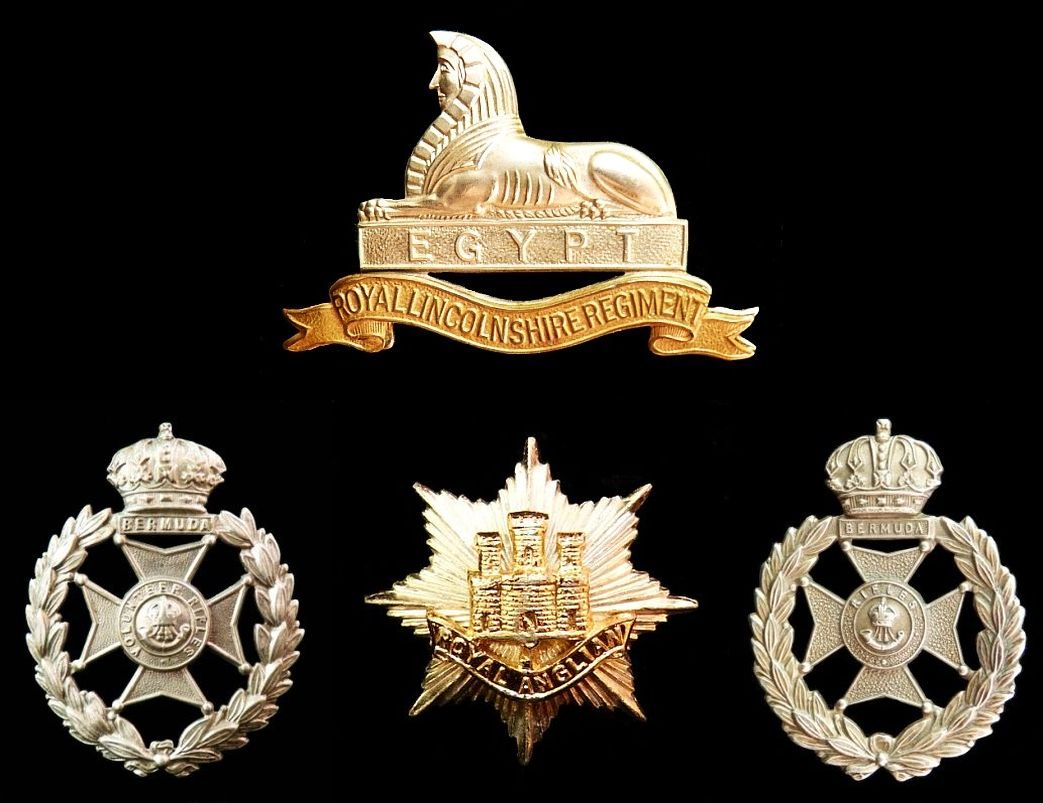
Badges of the Royal Lincolnshire Regiment, its successor, the Royal Anglian Regiment, its affiliate, the Bermuda Volunteer Rifle Corps, and the Bermuda Rifles (as the BVRC was retitled between 1951 and 1965)

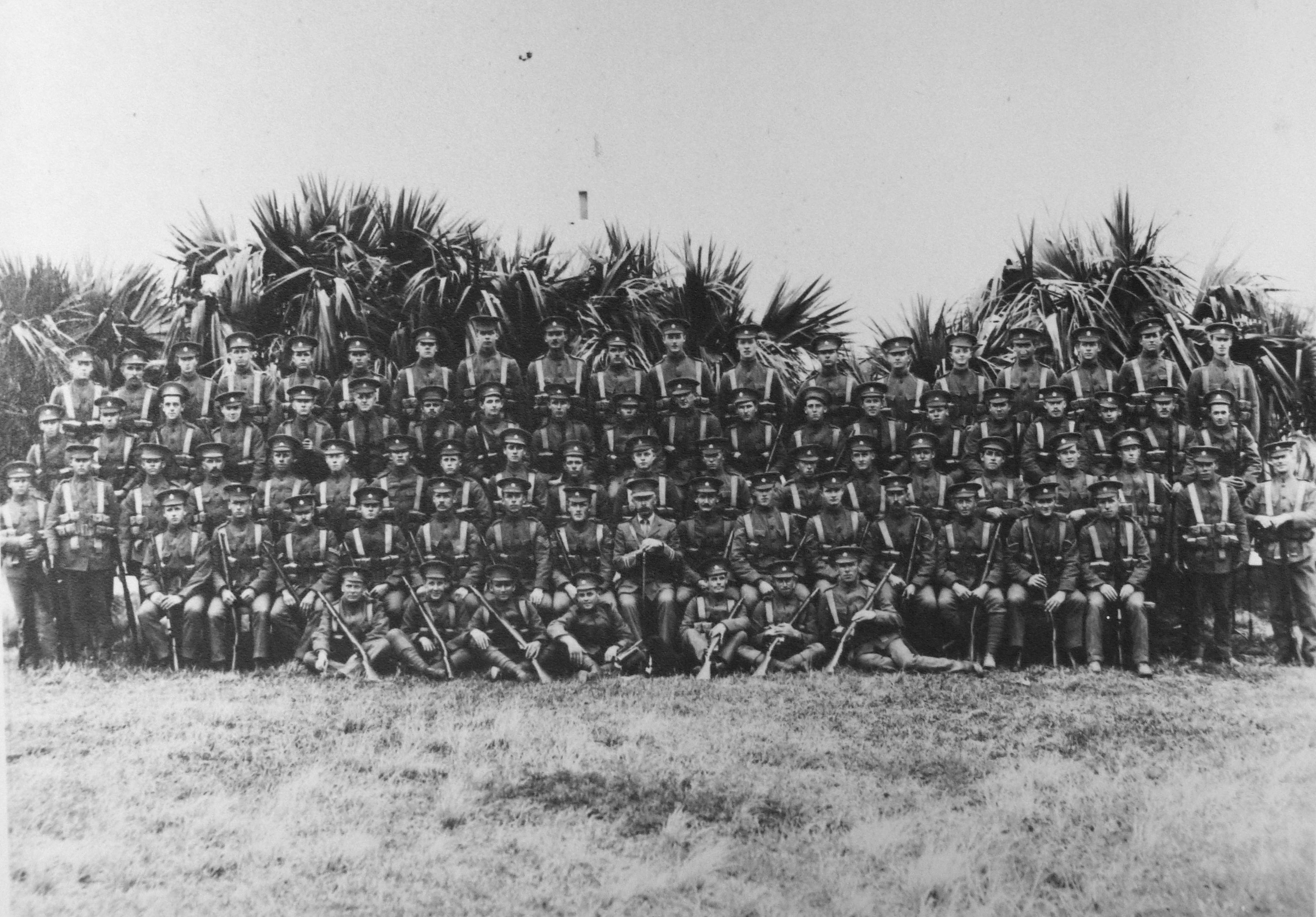
Bullock's Boys The First Contingent of the BVRC to the Lincolns, training in Bermuda for the Western Front, Winter 1914–15

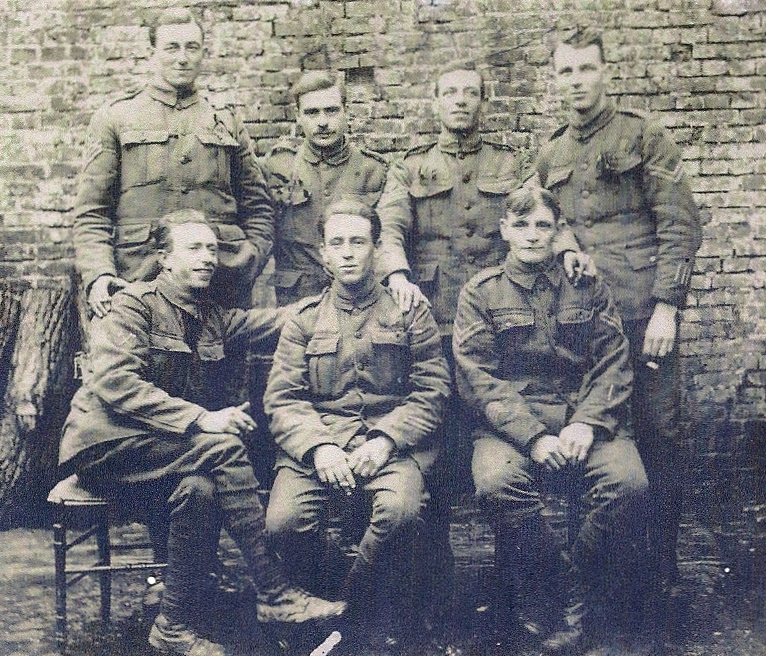
Bermuda Volunteer Rifle Corps soldiers with the Lincolnshire Regiment in France, 1918

The 1st Battalion landed at Le Havre as part of the 9th Brigade in the 3rd Division for service on the Western Front in August 1914. Notable engagements included the First Battle of Ypres in autumn 1914 and the Battle of Bellewaarde in May 1915, during which the commanding officer of the battalion, Major H. E. R. Boxer, was killed.

The Commanding Officer of 2nd Lincolns, Lieutenant-Colonel George Bunbury McAndrew, found himself acting Governor and Commander-in-Chief of the Imperial fortress of Bermuda in the absence of the Governor and General Officer Commanding-in-Chief, Lieutenant-General Sir George Bullock, and oversaw that colony's placement onto a war footing. The battalion left Bermuda on 14 September aboard HMCS Canada, escorted by HMCS Niobe, which had arrived in Bermuda the day before bearing the Royal Canadian Regiment, for Halifax, Nova Scotia, where they arrived on 18 September. Departing from there again to cross the Atlantic, the battalion returned to England on 3 October 1914, and was sent to the Western Front as part of the 25th Brigade in the 8th Division soon after, arriving in France on 5 November 1914. McAndrew was killed on 10 March 1915. Major engagements included the Battle of Aubers Ridge in May 1915 where the battalion incurred heavy losses and the Battle of the Somme in Autumn 1916 where the second-in-command of the battalion, Major F. W. Greatwood, was injured.

A contingent from the Bermuda Volunteer Rifle Corps composed of Captain Richard Tucker and 88 other ranks was detached in December 1914 to train for the Western Front. It was hoped this could join 2nd Lincolns, but 1 Lincolns' need for reinforcement was greater and it was attached to that battalion organised as two extra platoons of D Company (the 2nd Lincolns had recruited three Bermudians before it left the colony, including two Constables from the Bermuda Police, Corporal G. C. Wailes (who had previously served in the Royal Fusiliers), Lance-Corporal Louis William Morris, and Private Farrier. Wailes was repeatedly wounded and returned to Bermuda an invalid in April 1915. Morris was killed in action on 7 December 1914. Although commanders at the Regimental Depot had wanted to break the contingent apart, re-enlist its members as Lincolns, and distribute them throughout the Regiment as replacements, a letter from the War Office ensured that the BVRC contingent remained together as a unit, under its own badge. The contingent arrived in France with 1 Lincolns on 23 June 1915, the first colonial volunteer unit to reach the Western Front. The Contingent was withered away by casualties over the following year. 50% of its remaining strength was lost at Gueudecourt on 25 September 1916. The dozen survivors were merged with a newly arrived Second BVRC Contingent, of one officer and 36 other ranks, who had trained in Bermuda as Vickers machine gunners. Stripped of their Vickers machine guns (which had been collected, for the new Machine Gun Corps), the merged contingents were retrained as Lewis light machinegunners, and provided 12 gun teams to 1 Lincolns headquarters. By the end of the war, the two contingents had lost over 75% of their combined strength. Forty had died on active service, one received the O.B.E, and six the Military Medal. Sixteen enlisted men from the two contingents were commissioned, including the Sergeant Major of the First Contingent, Colour-Sergeant R.C. Earl, who would become Commanding Officer of the BVRC after the War (some of those commissioned moved to other units in the process, including flying ace Arthur Rowe Spurling and Henry J. Watlington, who both went to the Royal Flying Corps). Those surviving contingent members who had not already been sent home as invalids or transferred to other units were returned to Bermuda in several parties over the summer of 1919.

At the end of the war in 1918, the 1st Lincolns, under Frederick Spring, and the 3rd Lincolns were sent to Ireland to deal with the troubles in the unrecognised Irish Republic.

==== Territorial Force ====
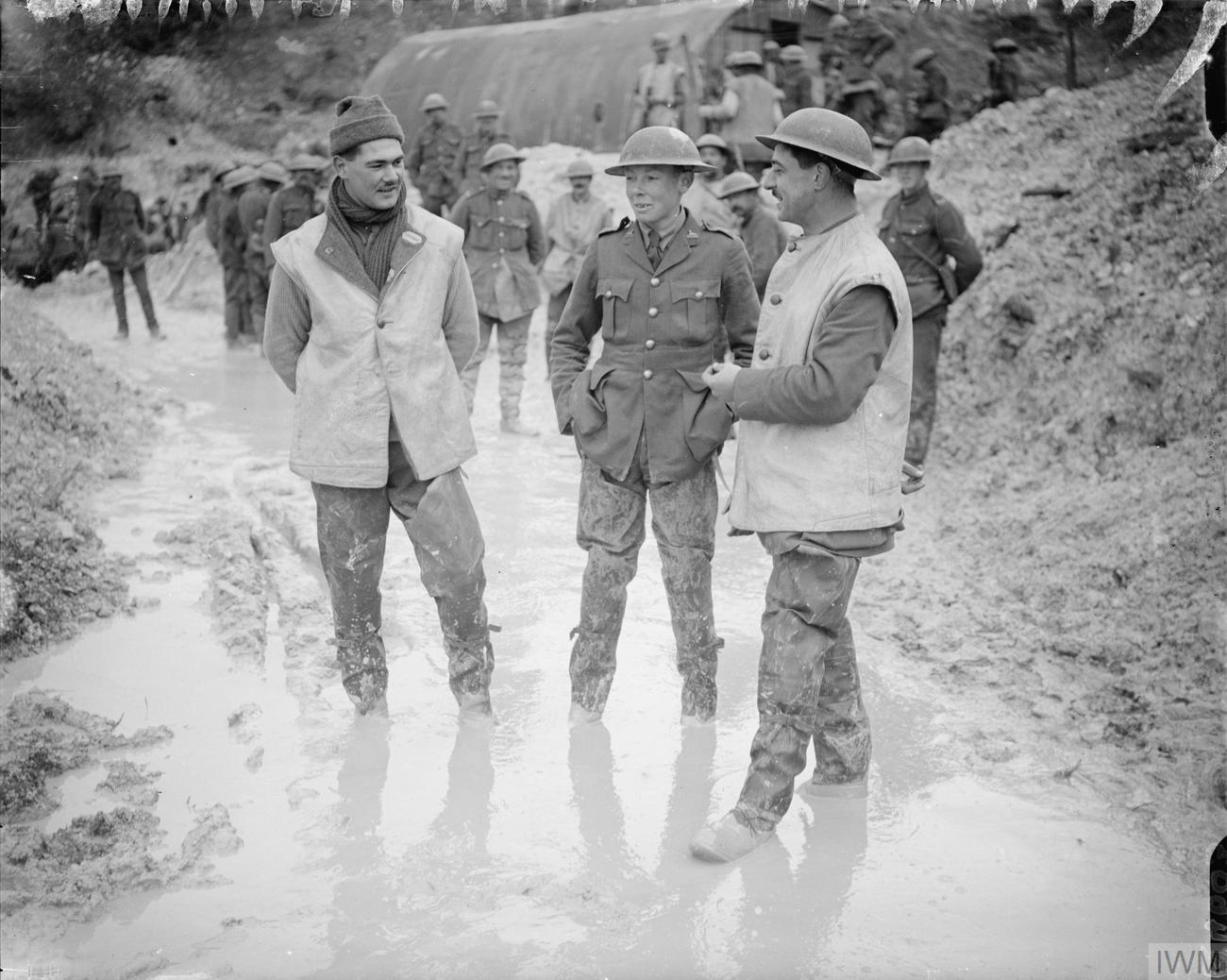
Battle of the Ancre. Officers of the Lincolnshire Regiment wearing trench waders and leather jerkins. Near St.Pierre Divion, November 1916.

The 1/4th Battalion and 1/5th Battalion landed as landed at Le Havre as part of the 138th Brigade in the 46th (North Midland) Division in March 1915 for service on the Western Front.

The 2/4th Battalion and 2/5th Battalion moved to Ireland as part of the 177th Brigade in the 59th (2nd North Midland) Division and took part in the response to the Easter Rising before landing in France in February 1917 for service on the Western Front.

==== New Armies ====
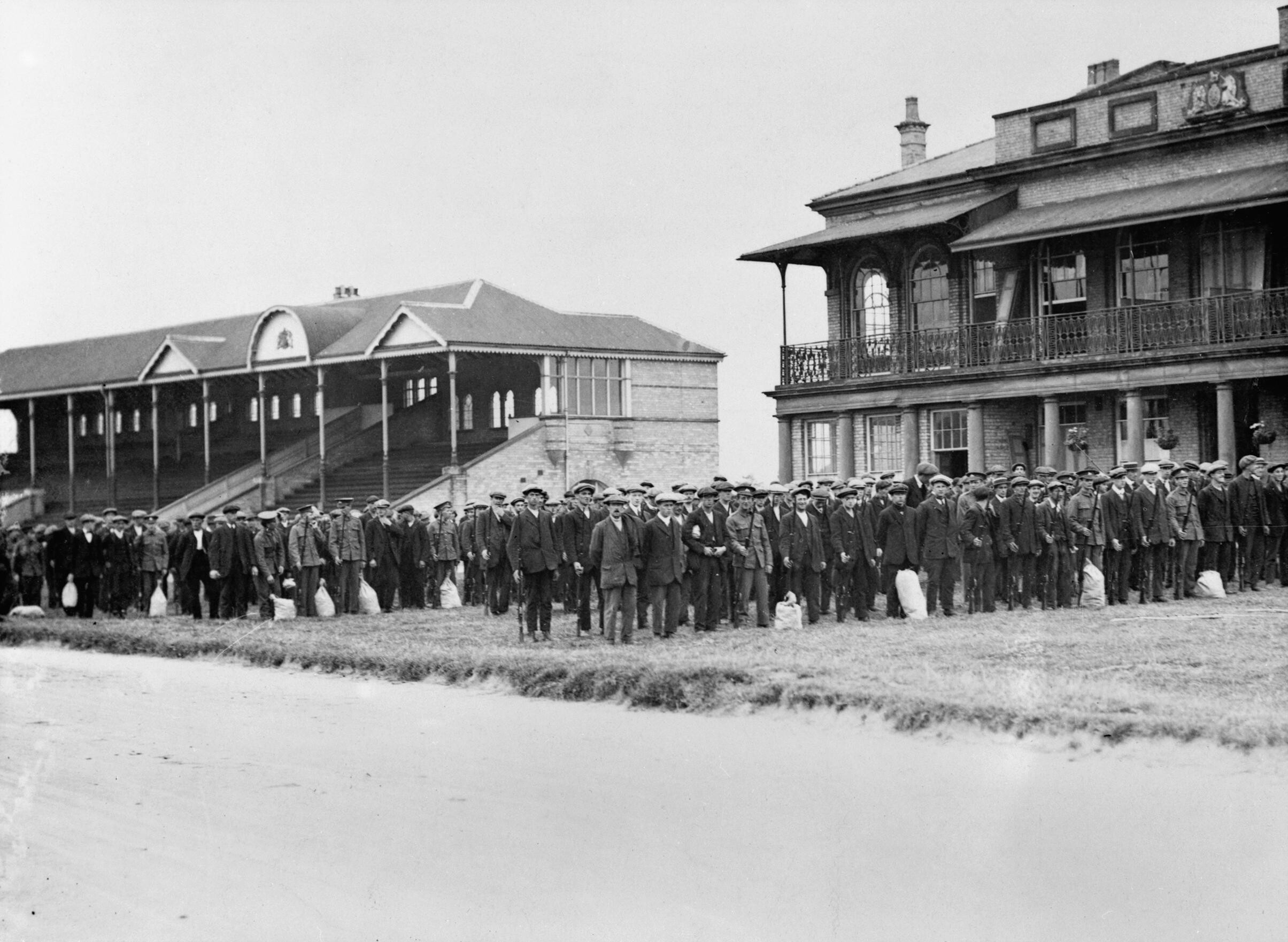
New recruits to the Lincolnshire Regiment parade on Lincoln Racecourse prior to leaving for Grantham, September 1914.

The 6th (Service) Battalion landed at Suvla Bay in Gallipoli as part of the 33rd Brigade in the 11th (Northern) Division in August 1915 and, having been evacuated at the end of the year, moved to Egypt in January 1916 and then to France in July 1916 for service on the Western Front.

The 7th (Service) Battalion landed at Boulogne as part of the 51st Brigade in the 17th (Northern) Division in July 1915 also for service on the Western Front.

The 8th (Service) Battalion landed at Boulogne as part of the 63rd Brigade in the 21st Division in September 1915 also for service on the Western Front.

The 10th (Service) Battalion (Grimsby, often known as the Grimsby Chums, landed in France as part of the 101st Brigade in the 34th Division in January 1916 also for service on the Western Front and saw action at the First day on the Somme in July 1916 and the Battle of Passchendaele in Autumn 1917.

=== Second World War ===
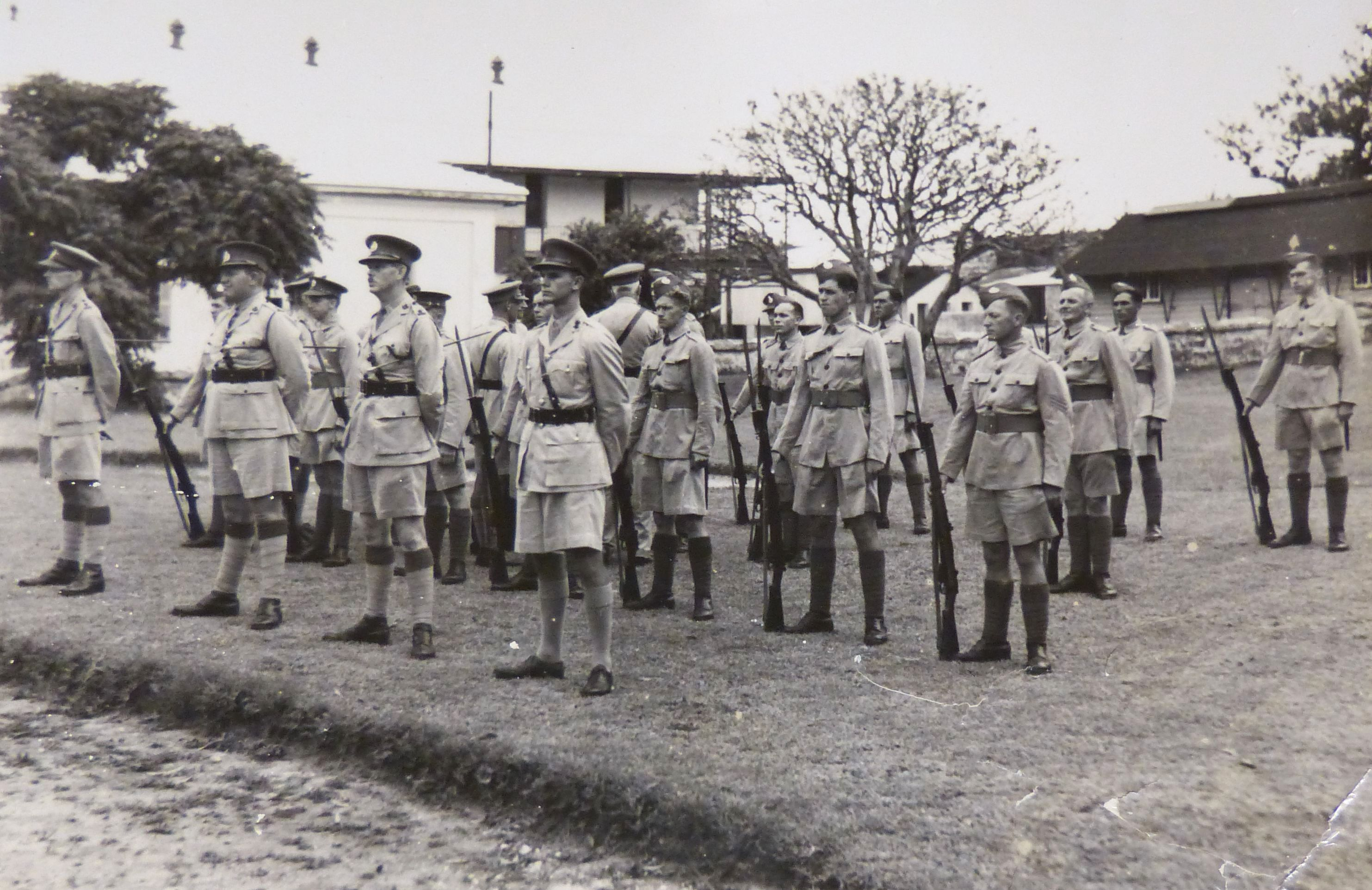
Governor of Bermuda and General Officer Commanding the Bermuda Command, Lieutenant-General Sir Denis Bernard, inspects the First Contingent of the BVRC to the Lincolnshire Regiment at Prospect Camp, Bermuda on 22 June 1940

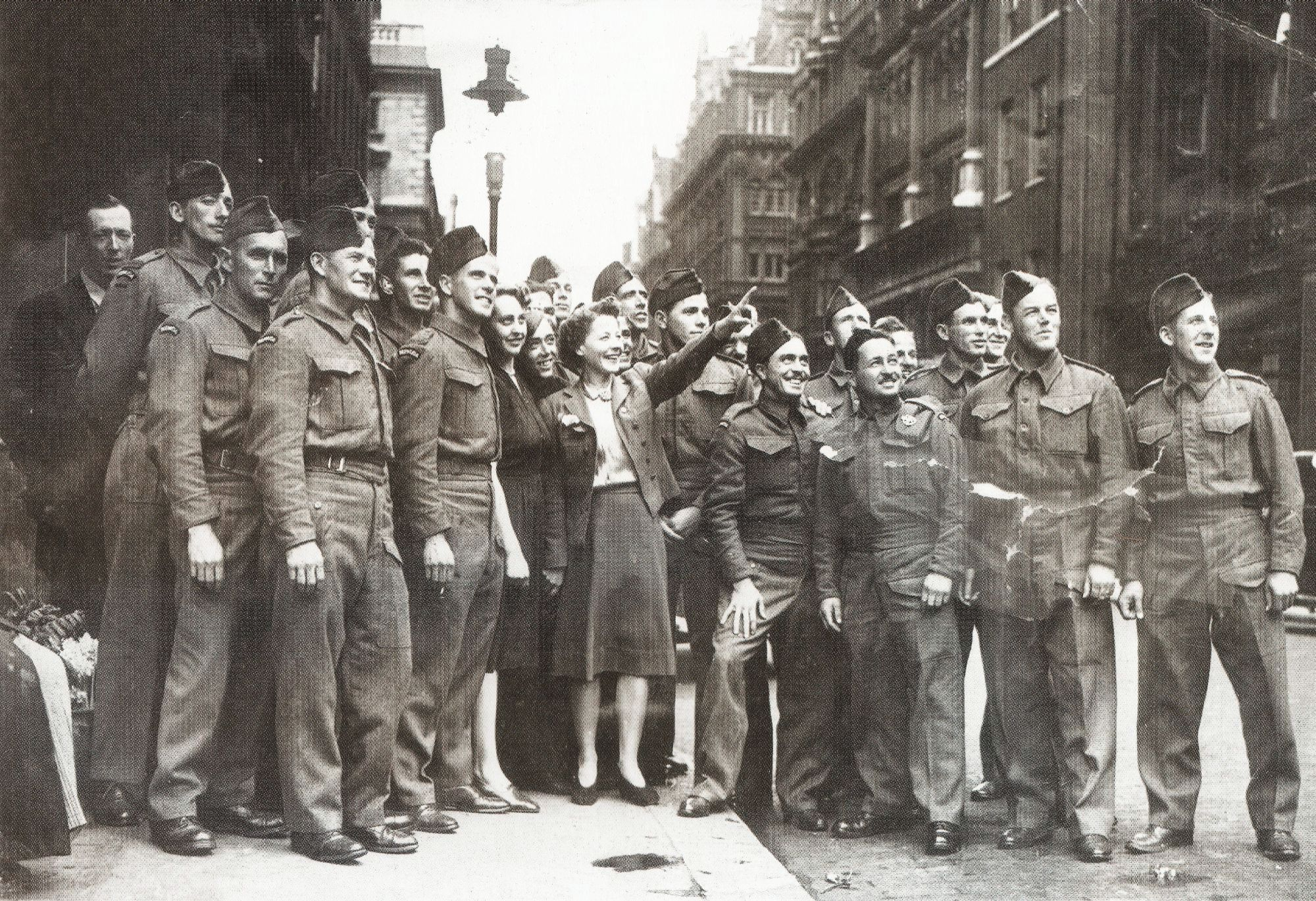
BVRC soldiers serving with the Lincolnshire Regiment, circa May 1944

The Second World War was declared on Sunday, 3 September 1939 and the two Territorial Army battalions, the 4th and the 6th (a duplicate of the 4th), were called-up immediately. The 2nd Battalion embarked for France with the 9th Infantry Brigade attached to the 3rd Infantry Division commanded by Major-General Bernard Montgomery in October 1939. They were followed by the 6th Battalion, part of 138th Brigade with the 46th Infantry Division, in April 1940; both served with the British Expeditionary Force (BEF) and managed to return from Dunkirk after the battles of France and Belgium. After returning to England, both battalions spent years in the United Kingdom on home defence anticipating a possible German invasion of the United Kingdom. The 2nd Battalion, remaining with the same brigade and division throughout the war, then spent the next four years training in various parts of the United Kingdom before taking part in the D-Day landings in June 1944. The battalion, commanded by Lieutenant Colonel Christopher Welby-Everard was then engaged throughout the Normandy Campaign, taking part in Operation Charnwood, Operation Goodwood, and throughout the rest of the Northwest Europe Campaign until Victory in Europe Day in May 1945.

The 1st Battalion, Lincolnshire Regiment was stationed in British India and saw no active service until 1942. They remained in India and the Far East throughout the war and were assigned to the 71st Indian Infantry Brigade, part of 26th Indian Infantry Division, in 1942. fighting the Imperial Japanese Army in the Burma Campaign and during the Battle of the Admin Box, the first major victory against the Japanese in the campaign, in early 1944 where Major Charles Ferguson Hoey was posthumously awarded the Victoria Cross, the only one to be awarded to the Lincolnshire Regiment during the Second World War.

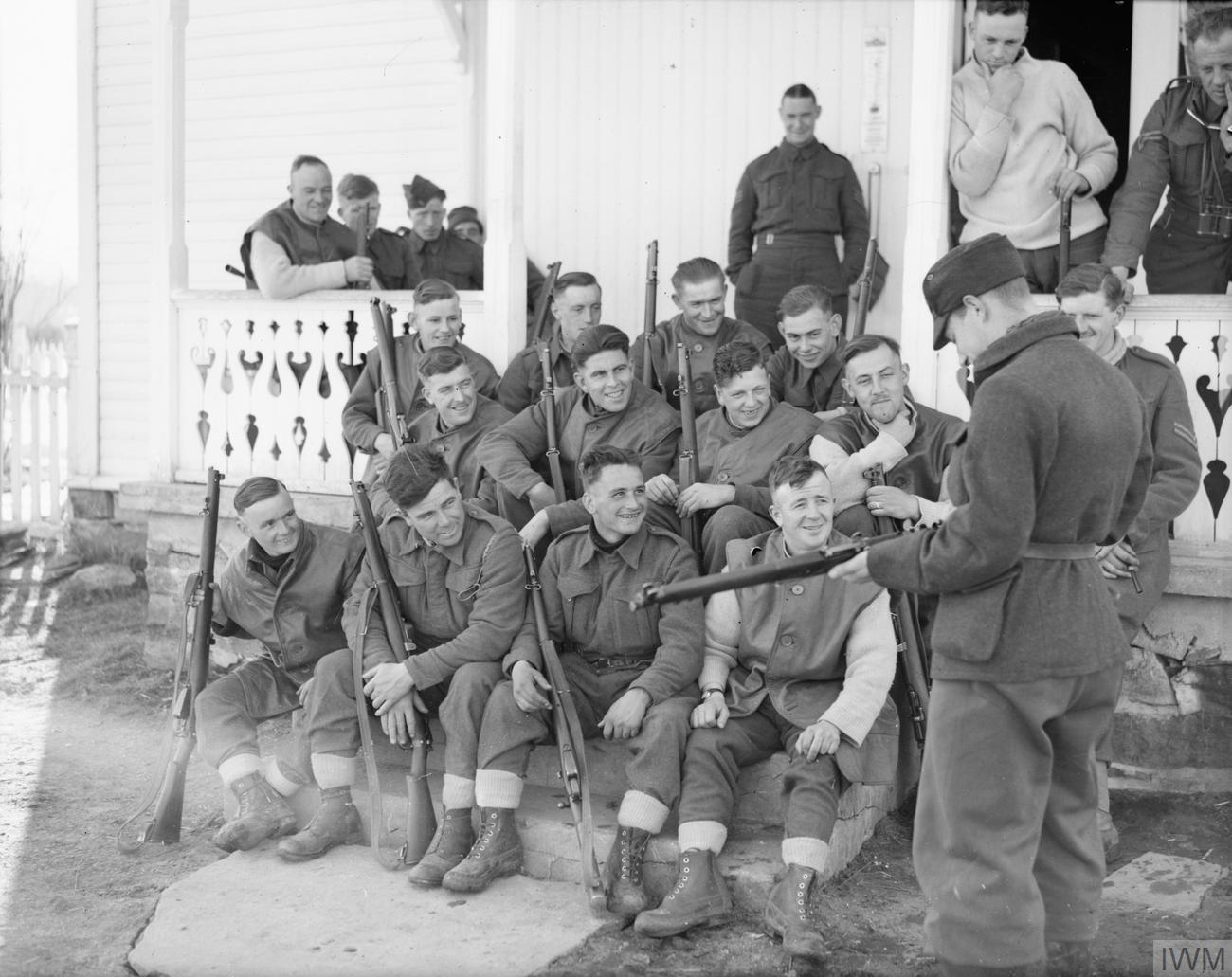
Men of the 4th Battalion, Lincolnshire Regiment at Skage, Norway after marching 56 miles across the mountains to escape being cut off, April 1940; a Norwegian soldier is seen examining one of their rifles

The Territorials of the 4th Battalion, part of 146th Brigade attached to 49th (West Riding) Infantry Division, were sent to Norway and were among the first British soldiers to come into contact against an advancing enemy in the field in the Second World War. Ill-equipped and without air support, they soon had to be evacuated. Within a few weeks, they were sent to garrison neutral Iceland. They trained as Alpine troops during the two years they were there. After returning to the United Kingdom in 1942, when the division gained the 70th Brigade, they were earmarked to form part of the 21st Army Group for the coming invasion of France and started training in preparation.

After two years spent on home defence, the 6th Battalion left the United Kingdom, still as part of the 138th (Lincoln and Leicester) Brigade in the 46th Infantry Division, in January 1943 to participate in the final stages of the Tunisia Campaign. In September 1943, the battalion, commanded by Lieutenant Colonel David Yates, took part in the landings at Salerno in Italy as part of Mark Clark's U.S. Fifth Army, suffering heavy losses and later captured Naples, crossed the Volturno Line and fought on the Winter Line and in the Battle of Monte Cassino in January 1944. The battalion returned to Egypt to refit in March 1944, by which time it had suffered heavy casualties and lost 518 killed, wounded or missing. It returned to the Italian Front in July 1944 and, after more hard fighting throughout the summer during the Battles for the Gothic Line, it sailed for Greece in December to help the civil authorities to keep order during the Greek Civil War. In April 1945, the 6th Lincolns returned to Italy for the final offensive but did not participate in any fighting and then moved into Austria for occupation duties.

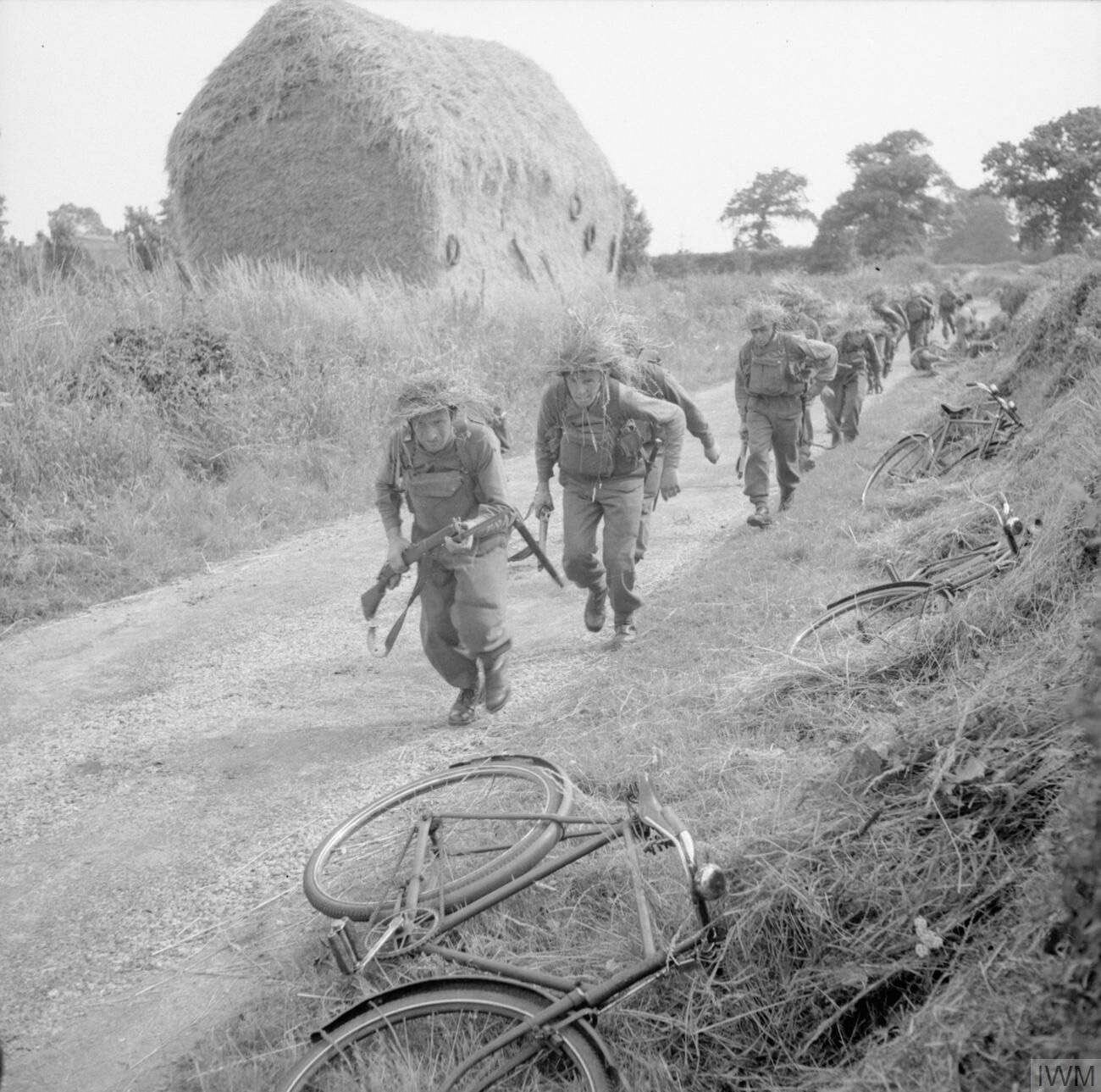
8th Battalion, Lincolnshire Regiment, abandon their bicycles and advance along a country lane during anti-invasion exercises at Weybourne in Norfolk, 23 July 1941

The Lincolnshire Regiment also raised two other battalions for hostilities-only, the 7th and 8th, created in June and July 1940 respectively. However, both were converted into other arms of service, the 7th becoming 102nd Light Anti-Aircraft Regiment, Royal Artillery on 1 December 1941 and the 8th becoming the 101st Anti-Tank Regiment, Royal Artillery.

The Bermuda Volunteer Rifle Corps again provided two drafts; one in June 1940, and a full company in 1944. Four Bermudians who served with the Lincolns during the war (three from the Bermuda Volunteer Rifle Corps) reached the rank of Major with the regiment: Major General Glyn Gilbert (later of the Parachute Regiment), Lieutenant Colonel John Brownlow Tucker (the first Commanding Officer of the Bermuda Regiment, amalgamated from the Bermuda Volunteer Rifle Corps and the Bermuda Militia Artillery in 1965), Major Anthony Smith (killed-in-action at Venraij, in 1944, and subject of an award-winning film, In The Hour of Victory), and Major Patrick Purcell, responsible for administering German newspapers in the British area of occupation. Among other members of the 1940 contingent from the Bermuda Volunteer Rifle Corps was Bernard John Abbott, a school teacher and pre-war Bermuda Cadet Corps officer re-commissioned into the Bermuda Volunteer Rifle Corps’ Emergency Reserve of officers with the rank of Second-Lieutenant (Acting Major) in accordance with a War Office cable of the 4 May 1939, who joined 50th Holding Battalion, in Norfolk, which became 8th Battalion, Lincolnshire Regiment. He ended the war as a staff officer in the Far East, and The London Gazette of 25 December 1945 recorded “War Subs. Maj. H. J. ABBOTT .(108051) relinquishes his commn., 26th Dec. 1945, and is granted the hon. rank of Lt.-Col.”.

=== Post-war years ===
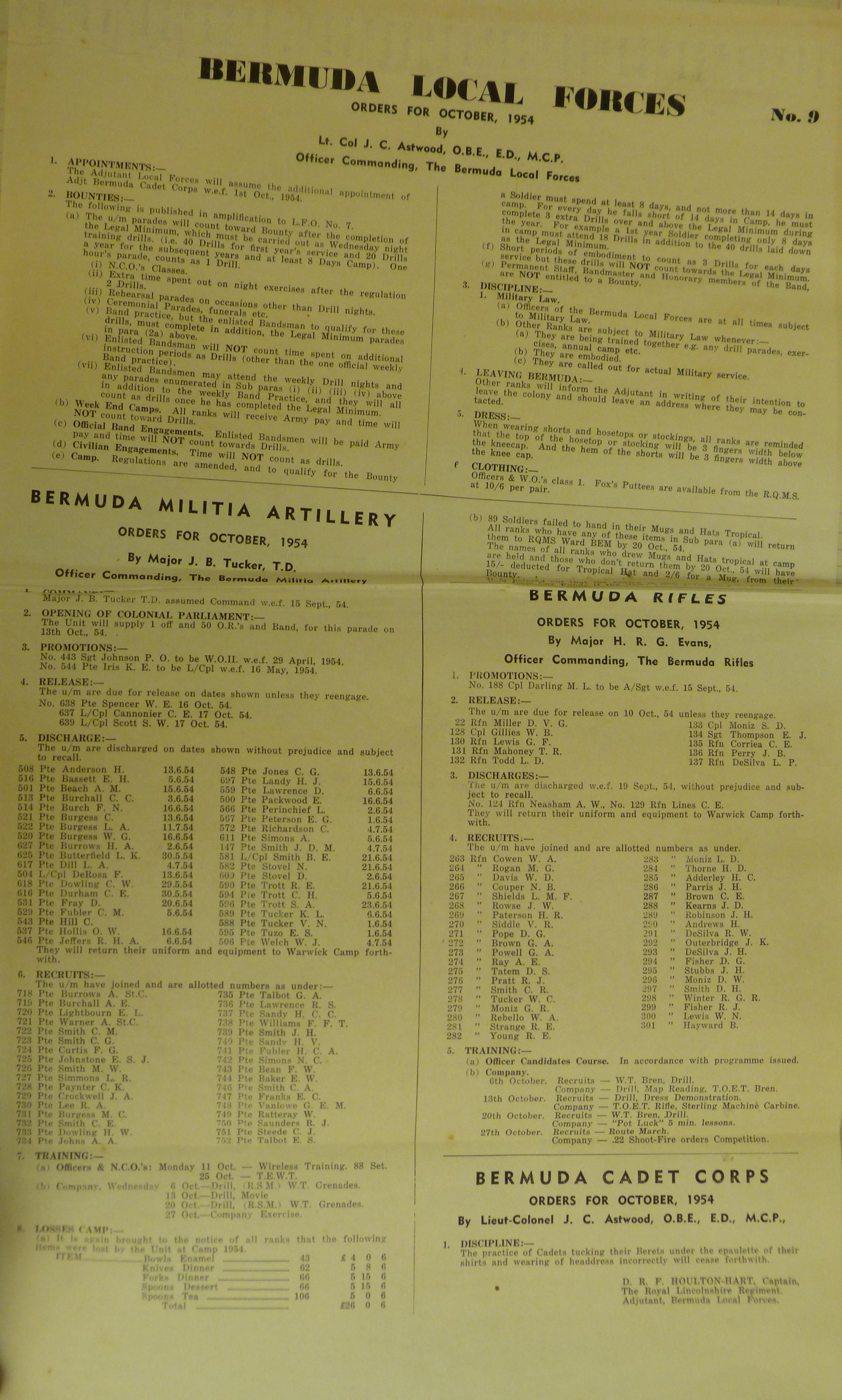
Bermuda Local Forces Orders for October 1954, by Captain Darby Robert Follett Houlton-Hart, MC, of the Royal Lincolnshire Regiment, Adjutant Bermuda Local Forces

After the war, the 4th and 6th battalions were placed in 'suspended animation' in 1946 but were both reformed on 1 January 1947. However, on 1 July 1950, the 6th was merged with the 4th to create the 4th/6th Battalion. On 28 October 1948, the 2nd Battalion was amalgamated with the 1st Battalion. Between 1955–1957 the regiment fought in the Malayan Emergency.

The Royal Lincolnshire Regiment and its successors maintained its relationship with the Bermuda Volunteer Rifle Corps (renamed the Bermuda Rifles in 1949) after the Second World War. When the Bermuda Militia Artillery (a reserve sub-unit of the Royal Artillery) had been re-tasked as a company of infantry on the closure of St. David's Battery in 1953, it had been grouped with the Bermuda Rifles under a battalion-level headquarters company titled Headquarters Bermuda Local Forces (not to be confused with the Command Headquarters of the Bermuda Garrison, to which it was subsidiary, with Governor of Bermuda Lieutenant-General Sir Alexander Hood serving as Commander-in-Chief and Brigadier J.C. Smith, Royal Artillery, as Officer Commanding Troops) with a lieutenant-colonel in command. From this point, the Royal Lincolnshire Regiment had also provided an officer as Adjutant to the Bermuda Local Forces and Secretary to the Local Forces Board, beginning with Captain (later Major) Darby Robert Follett Houlton-Hart (according to the 13 January 1954, issue of The Bermuda Recorder newspaper, the reorganisation of the two units under a new common headquarters had begun operating unofficially since the arrival in the colony on 17 November, of the command's new Adjutant, Captain D. R. F. Houlton-Hart, M.C., of the Royal Lincolnshire Regiment. The make-up of the new command is as follows:- Col. Astwood, Commanding Officer; Captain D. R. F. Houlton-Hart, Adjutant, one Regimental Sergeant-Major, one Regimental Quartermaster Sergeant, a Sergeant instructor for each unit and two medical officers. The same article also recorded that the new system had been tried during the Big Three Conference last month when all troops were under the command of Lt.-Col. J. R. Johnson of the Royal Welch Fusiliers) posted to Bermuda from 1953 to 1957. In addition to serving as the Bermuda Command Adjutant and the Bermuda Local Forces Adjutant, Captain Houlton-Hart was also the adjutant of the Bermuda Cadet Corps.

In 1960, the regiment amalgamated with the Northamptonshire Regiment to form the 2nd East Anglian Regiment (Duchess of Gloucester's Own Royal Lincolnshire and Northamptonshire) which was later amalgamated with the 1st East Anglian Regiment (Royal Norfolk and Suffolk), 3rd East Anglian Regiment (16th/44th Foot) and the Royal Leicestershire Regiment in September 1964 to form the Royal Anglian Regiment.

The Royal Lincolnshire Regiment's paternal relationship to the Bermuda Rifles and the Bermuda Local Forces was continued by the 2nd East Anglian Regiment (Duchess of Gloucester's Own Royal Lincolnshire and Northamptonshire) and the Royal Anglian Regiment until the three Bermudian company-sized units amalgamated in 1965 to form the Bermuda Regiment (from 2015 the Royal Bermuda Regiment), with the relationship maintained since then between the Royal Anglian Regiment and the Royal Bermuda Regiment.

Currently, 674 Squadron Army Air Corps uses the sphinx as an emblem within its crest in honour of its local connections with the Royal Lincolnshire Regiment.

== Regimental museum ==
The Royal Lincolnshire Regiment and Lincolnshire Yeomanry collections are displayed in Lincoln's Museum of Lincolnshire Life. Artefacts concerning the Bermuda Volunteer Rifle Corps contingents that served with the Lincolnshires during the two world wars are displayed in the Bermuda Maritime Museum (part of the British Overseas Territory's territorial museum) in the Royal Naval Dockyard, Bermuda.

== Battle honours ==
The regiment's battle honours are as follows:

- Earlier Wars
  - Steenkirk, 8 July 1692; War of the Spanish Succession, 1702–1713; Blenheim, 13 August 1704; Ramillies, 23 May 1706; Oudenarde, 11 July 1708; Malplaquet, 11 September 1709; Bouchain, 13 September 1711; Peninsula, 1812–14; Sobraon, 10 February 1846; Mooltan, 1848; Goojuarat, 21 February 1849; Punjab, 1848–49; Lucknow 1858; Atbara, 1898; Khartoum, 1898; Paardeberg, February 1900; South Africa 1900–02
- Great War:
  - Mons, Le Cateau, Retreat from Mons, Marne 1914, Aisne 1914, '18, La Bassée 1914, Messines 1914, 1917, 1918, Armentières 1914, Ypres 1914, '15, '17, Nonne Bosschen, Neuve Chapelle, Gravenstafel, St. Julien, Frezenberg, Bellewaarde, Aubers, Loos, Somme 1916, '18, Albert 1916, '18, Bazentin, Delville Wood, Pozières, Flers-Courcelette, Morval, Thiepval, Ancre 1916, '18, Arras 1917, '18,Scarpe 1917, '18, Arleux, Pilckem, Langemarck 1917, Menin Road, Polygon Wood, Broodseinde, Poelcappelle, Passchendaele, Cambrai 1917, '18, St. Quentin, Bapaume 1918, Lys, Estaires, Bailleul, Kemmel, Amiens, Drocourt Quéant, Hindenburg Line, Épéhy, Canal du Nord, St. Quentin Canal, Beaurevoir, Selle, Sambre, France and Flanders 1914–18, Suvla, Landing at Suvla, Scimitar Hill, Gallipoli 1915, Egypt 1916
- Second World War:
  - Vist, Norway 1940, Dunkirk 1940, Normandy Landing, Cambes, Fontenay le Pesnil, Defence of Rauray, Caen, Orne, Bourguébus Ridge, Troarn, Nederrijn, Le Havre, Antwerp-Turnhout Canal, Venraij, Venlo Pocket, Rhineland, Hochwald, Lingen, Bremen, Arnhem 1945, North-West Europe 1940, '44–45, Sedjenane I, Mine de Sedjenane, Argoub Selah, North Africa 1943, Salerno, Vietri Pass, Capture of Naples, Cava di Terreni, Volturno Crossing, Garigliano Crossing, Monte Tuga, Gothic Line, Monte Gridolfo, Gemmano Ridge, Lamone Crossing, San Marino, Italy 1943–45, Donbaik, Point 201 (Arakan), North Arakan, Buthidaung, Ngakyedauk Pass, Ramree, Burma 1943–45

== Victoria Crosses ==
Victoria Crosses awarded to men of the Regiment were:

- Private Denis Dempsey, Indian Mutiny (12 August 1857/14 March 1858)
- Lieutenant Henry Marshman Havelock-Allan, Indian Mutiny (16 July 1857)
- Private John Kirk, Indian Mutiny (4 June 1857)
- Lance-Sergeant Arthur Evans First World War (2 September 1918)
- Captain Percy Hansen, First World War (9 August 1915)
- Temp Major Charles Ferguson Hoey, Second World War (16 February 1944)
- Acting Corporal Charles Richard Sharpe, First World War (9 May 1915)
- Captain John Brunt, Second World War (9 December 1944)

== Colonel-in-Chief ==
1888–1902: F.M. Prince William Augustus Edward of Saxe-Weimar, KP, GCB, GCVO

== Colonels of the Regiment ==
Colonels of the regiment were:

- 1685–1688: Col. John Granville, 1st Earl of Bath
- 1688: Col. Sir Charles Carney
- 1688–1693: Col. John Granville, 1st Earl of Bath [reappointed]
- 1693–1703: Lt-Gen. Sir Bevil Granville
- 1703–1715: Lt-Gen. William North, 6th Baron North & Grey
- 1715–1737: Lt-Gen. Henry Grove
- 1737–1746: Lt-Gen. Francis Columbine
- 1746–1749: F.M. James O'Hara, 2nd Baron Tyrawley (Lord Kilmaine)
- 1749–1763: Lt-Gen. Edward Pole

=== 10th Regiment of Foot ===
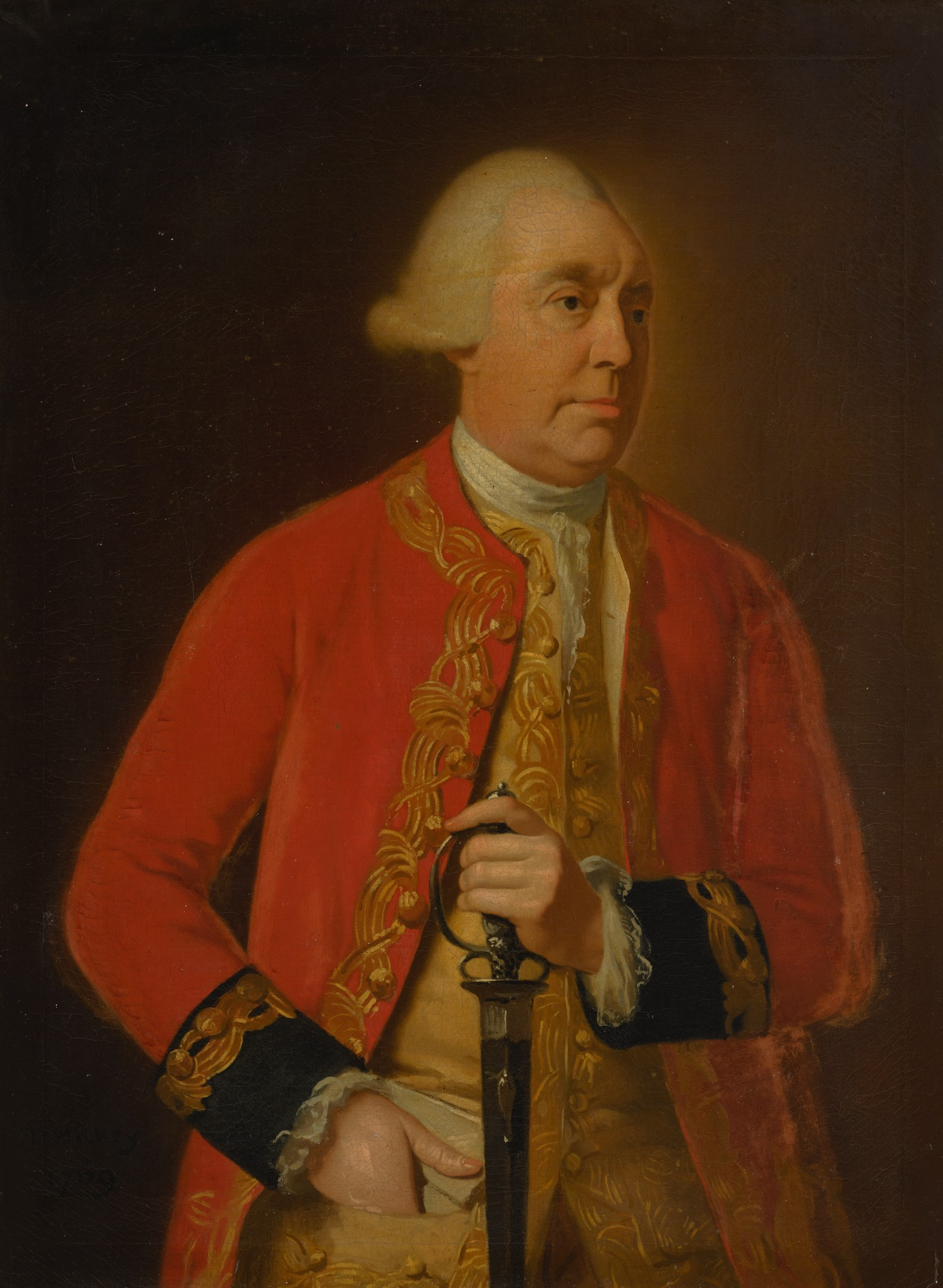
Portrait of Major General Edward Sandford

- 1763–1781: Lt-Gen. Edward Sandford
- 1781–1795: Lt-Gen. Sir Robert Murray Keith KB

=== 10th (North Lincolnshire) Regiment of Foot ===
- 1795–1811: Henry Edward Fox
- 1811–1824: Thomas Maitland
- 1824–1847: Sir John Lambert KCB
- 1847–1860: Sir Thomas McMahon, 2nd Baronet
- 1860–1863: Lt-Gen. Thomas Burke
- 1863–1874: Lt-Gen. Sir Sidney John Cotton, GCB
- 1874–1878: Lt-Gen. Sir John Garvock, GCB
- 1878–1888: F.M. Prince William Augustus Edward of Saxe-Weimar, KP, GCB, GCVO

=== The Lincolnshire Regiment ===
- 1888–1890: Gen. Sir Henry Errington Longden, KCB, CSI
- 1890: Gen. Reginald Yonge Shipley, CB
- 1890–1903: Gen. Sir Julius Richard Glyn, KCB
- 1903–1908: Lt-Gen. George Hyde Page
- 1908–1914: Lt-Gen. Henry Fanshawe Davies
- 1914–1938: Maj-Gen. Charles Rudyerd Simpson, CB
- 1938–1948: Maj-Gen. John Hedley Thornton Priestman, CB, CBE, DSO, MC

=== The Royal Lincolnshire Regiment ===
- 1948–1958: Maj-Gen. John Arnold Atkinson Griffin, DSO
- 1958: Brig. Ralph Henry Lefroy Oulton, CBE

== See also ==
- John Brunt who won the VC in Italy while attached to the regiment
- Charles Ferguson Hoey who won the VC in Burma while attached to the regiment
- The Lincoln and Welland Regiment

== Sources ==
- Brice, Beatrix (2014). The Battle Book of Ypres: A Reference to Military Operations in the Ypres Salient 1914–18. Pen & Sword. ISBN 978-1473821231.
- Cannon, Richard (1847). Historical record of the Tenth, or the North Lincolnshire Regiment containing an account of the formation of the regiment in 1685 and of its subsequent services to 1847. CIHM/ICMH Microfiche series, no. 48345. Parker, Furnivall and Parker. ISBN 9780665483455.
- Heathcote, Tony (1999). The British Field Marshals 1736–1997. Barnsley, UK: Pen & Sword. ISBN 0-85052-696-5.
- Müller, P. F. (1873). Wilhelm III von Oranien und Georg Friedrich von Waldeck, Volume II (in German). The Hague.
- Spring, Colonel F. G. (2008). The History of the 6th (Service) Battalion, Lincolnshire Regiment. Poacher Books. ISBN 9780955991417.
- Swinson, Arthur (1972). A Register of the Regiments and Corps of the British Army. London: The Archive Press. ISBN 0-85591-000-3.
- Westlake, Ray (2010). Tracing the Rifle Volunteers. Barnsley: Pen and Sword. ISBN 978-1-84884-211-3.
