= Taukkyan War Cemetery =

Allied WWII cemetery in Myanmar

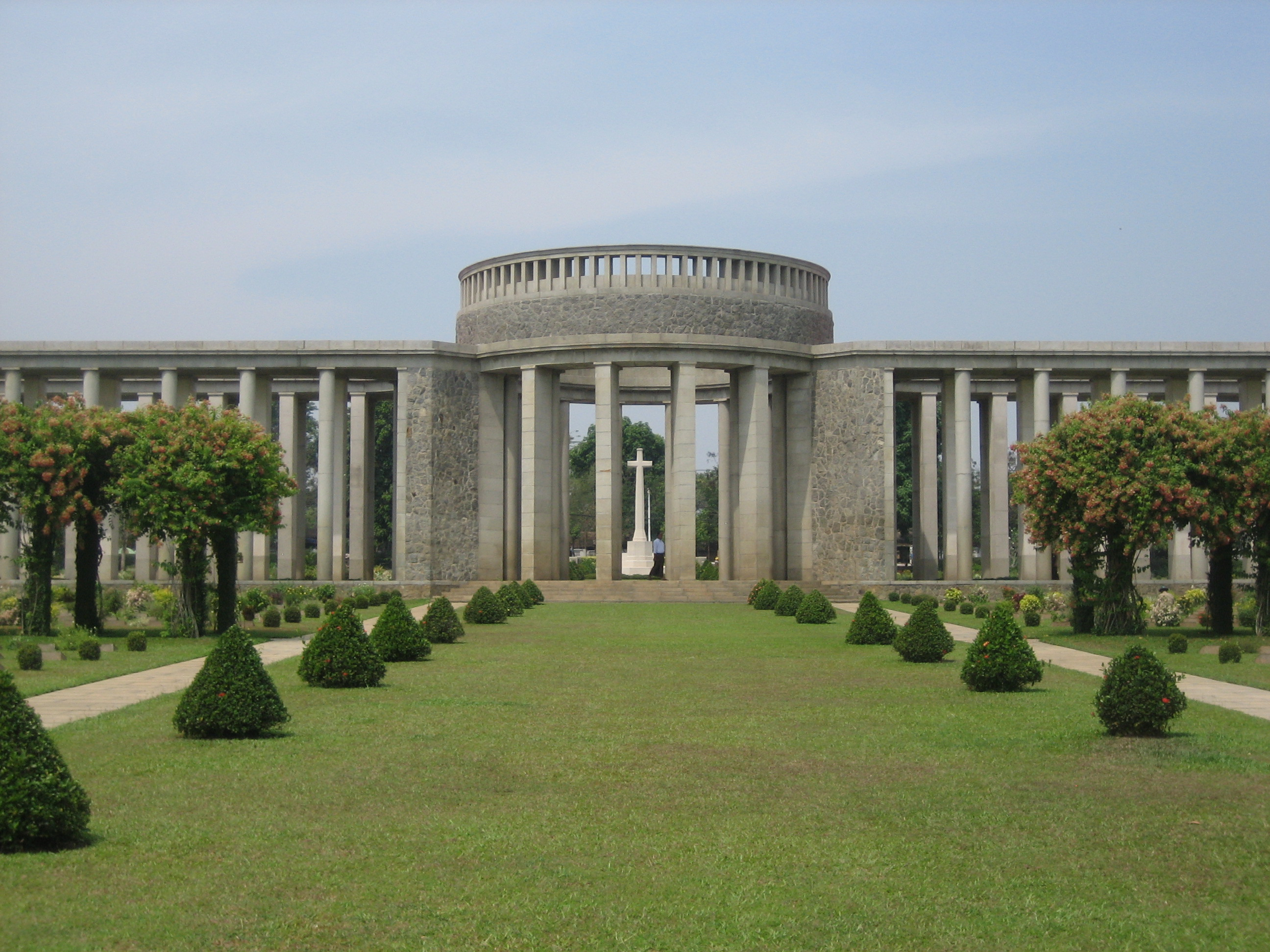
- Taukkyan War cemetery
- Interactive map of Taukkyan War Cemetery

Details
- Established: 1951
- Location: Htauk Kyant, Mingaladon Township
- Country: Burma
- Coordinates: 17.0356°N 96.1317°E
- Type: British military of WWI and WWII (closed)
- Owned by: Commonwealth War Graves Commission
- No. of graves: 6,374

The Taukkyan War Cemetery (Burmese: ထောက်ကြံ့ စစ်သင်္ချိုင်း) is a cemetery for Allied soldiers from the British Commonwealth who died in battle in Burma during the Second World War. The cemetery is in the village of Taukkyan, about 25 kilometres (16 mi) north of Yangon on Pyay Road. It is maintained by the Commonwealth War Graves Commission.

The cemetery contains the graves of 6,374 soldiers who died in the Second World War, the graves of 52 soldiers who died in Burma during the First World War, and memorial pillars (The Rangoon Memorial) with the names of over 27,000 Commonwealth soldiers who died in Burma during the Second World War in the Burma Campaign but who have no known grave. There are 867 graves that contain the remains of unidentified soldiers.

== History ==
The cemetery was opened in 1951 and the remains of Commonwealth soldiers who died in Meiktila, Akyab (Sittwe), Mandalay, and Sahmaw were transferred here and the graves are grouped together by these battles. A large number of the 27,000 names of Commonwealth soldiers are of the Indian Army and African soldiers who fought and died in Burma. Of the total, 1,819 graves are Indian soldiers.

== Notable graves ==
Seven holders of the Victoria Cross (VC) are interred at this site and the names of several (including five Indian VC holders) are inscribed on the Rangoon Memorial. The interred soldiers are:

- Michael Allmand (1923–1944), for action in Burma on 23 June 1944
- Frank Blaker (1920–1944), for action in Burma on 9 July 1944
- George Albert Cairns (1913–1944), for action in Burma on 13 March 1944
- Charles Ferguson Hoey (1914–1944), for action in Burma on 16 February 1944
- George Arthur Knowland (1922–1945), for action in Burma on 31 January 1945
- Claud Raymond (1923–1945), for action in Burma on 21 March 1945
- William Basil Weston (1924–1945), for action in Burma on 3 March 1945

Other notable people buried there include:

- South African first-class cricketer Leigh Alexander (1898–1943)
- British flying ace Bryan Draper
- Welsh poet Alun Lewis
- Englishman Tom Mitford, the only brother of the famous Mitford sisters.

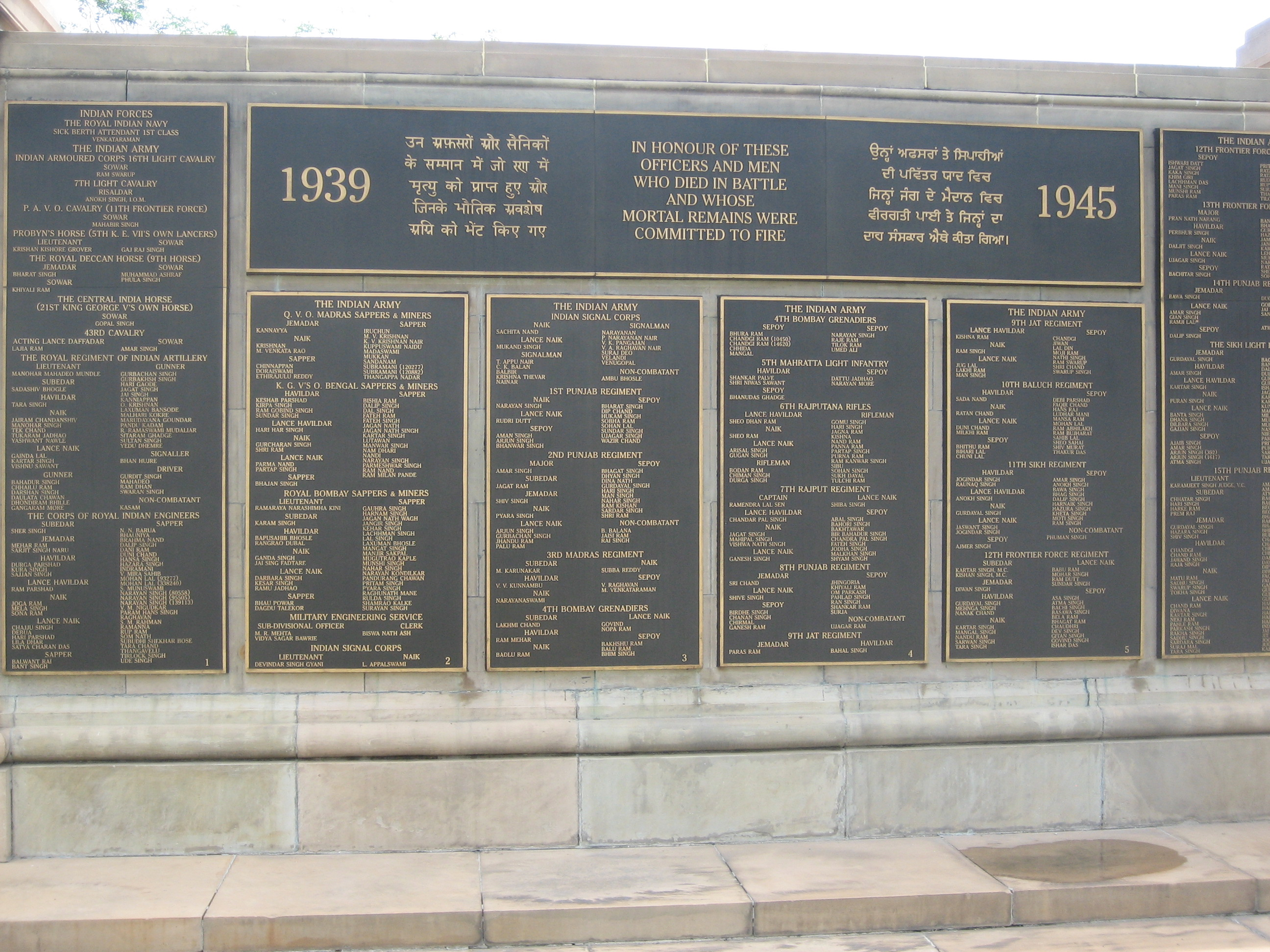
Memorial plaque in English, Hindi, and Gurmukhi

Also inscribed, in English, Hindi, Urdu, Gurmukhi, and Burmese, on the Rangoon Memorial are the words they died for all free men. The Taukkyan Cremation Memorial, also at the site, commemorates more than 1000 soldiers who were cremated according to their faith.

== See also ==
- Thanbyuzayat War Cemetery
- Burma Campaign
- Fourteenth Army (XIV Army)
- Chindits
