= Charles Ferguson Hoey =

Recipient of the Victoria Cross

Charles Ferguson Hoey VC MC
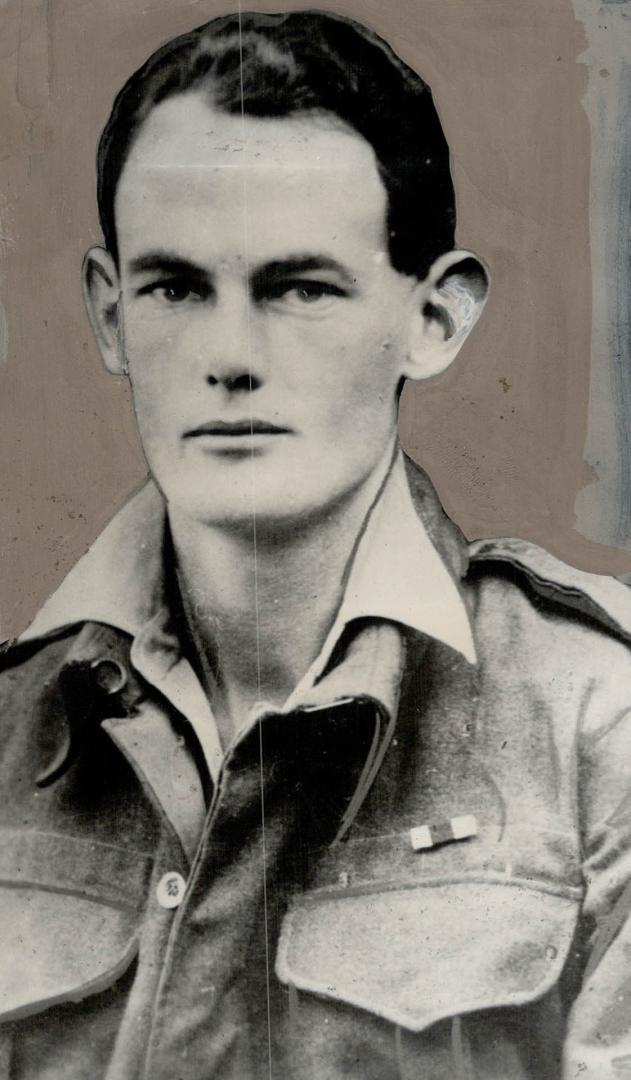
- Born: 29 March 1914; Duncan, British Columbia
- Died: 16 February 1944 (aged 29); Ngakyedauk Pass, Admin Box, Arakan, British Burma
- Burial place: Taukkyan War Cemetery, Rangoon, Burma
- Military career
- Allegiance: United Kingdom
- Branch: British Army
- Service years: 1936 - 1944
- Rank: Major
- Service number: 71106
- Units: Queen's Own Royal West Kent Regiment; Lincolnshire Regiment
- Conflicts: Second World War: Pacific War; Burma campaign; Burma campaign 1944; Battle of the Admin Box (DOW)
- Awards: Victoria Cross; Military Cross

Major Charles Ferguson Hoey VC MC (29 March 1914 – 16 February 1944) was a Canadian recipient of the Victoria Cross, the highest and most prestigious award for gallantry in the face of the enemy that can be awarded to British and Commonwealth forces.

== Military career ==
Charles Ferguson Hoey was born on 29 March 1914, the son of Ferguson and Mary Rudyerd Hoey, of Duncan, Vancouver Island, British Columbia, Canada. Grandson, through his mother, of Major General Charles Rudyerd Simpson CB, Colonel, The Lincolnshire Regiment. He started his education at Queen Margaret's School in Duncan, then attended Duncan Grammar School and Duncan High School.

Hoey went to England in 1933 in order to pursue a military career. He first enlisted in the British Army as a private soldier in the Queen's Own Royal West Kent Regiment, before winning a cadetship to the Royal Military College, Sandhurst and went there in September 1935. He graduated in December 1936 and was commissioned as a second lieutenant in the Lincolnshire Regiment, later the Royal Lincolnshire Regiment, on 28 January 1937. He transferred to the 1st Battalion of the Lincolns, then stationed in India, and sailed for there in September 1937. He went to Burma with the 1st Battalion in 1942 and served there until his death in February 1944. He was awarded the Military Cross (MC) in July 1943 for his outstanding service at Maungdaw during a raid on a Japanese position.

== Victoria Cross ==
He was 29 years old, and a temporary major in the 1st Battalion, Lincolnshire Regiment, at the time of the Battle of the Admin Box. A Corps HQ made up mostly of support units and muleteers reinforced with some combat troops was besieged by Japanese forces. The battalion was to break through the attackers and reinforce those within the Box.

On 16 February 1944 near the Ngakyedauk Pass, Arakan region Major Hoey's company came under devastating machine-gun fire, but Major Hoey did not waver in his advance on the objective. Although wounded in the head and leg he went forward alone with a Bren gun and tackled a troublesome enemy strong point, destroying it and killing all the occupants, but he was mortally wounded.

The citation reads as follows:

"In BURMA, on the 16th February, 1944, Major Hoey's company formed part of a force which was ordered to capture a position at all costs. After a night march through enemy-held territory, the force was met at the foot of the position by machine gun fire. Major Hoey personally led his company under heavy machine gun and rifle fire up to the objective. Although wounded at least twice in the leg and head, he seized a Bren gun from one of his men and, firing from the hip, led his company into the objective. In spite of his wounds the company had difficulty in keeping up with him, and Major Hoey reached the enemy strong post first, where he killed all the occupants before being mortally wounded. Major Hoey's outstanding gallantry and leadership, his total disregard of personal safety and his grim determination to reach the objective resulted in the capture of this vital position."

His remains are now interred at Taukkyan War Cemetery in Burma.

== The medal ==
His Victoria Cross is displayed in the Galleries of the Royal Lincolnshire Regiment at the Museum of Lincolnshire Life in Lincoln, England.

== Charles Hoey VC Memorial Park ==
Charles Hoey VC Memorial Park has been dedicated in downtown Duncan, B.C. This park is located along Canada Avenue between Trunk Road and Ingram Street. The Cowichan cenotaph, located within the park, is inscribed with the names of area residents killed in the two World Wars and the war in Korea.

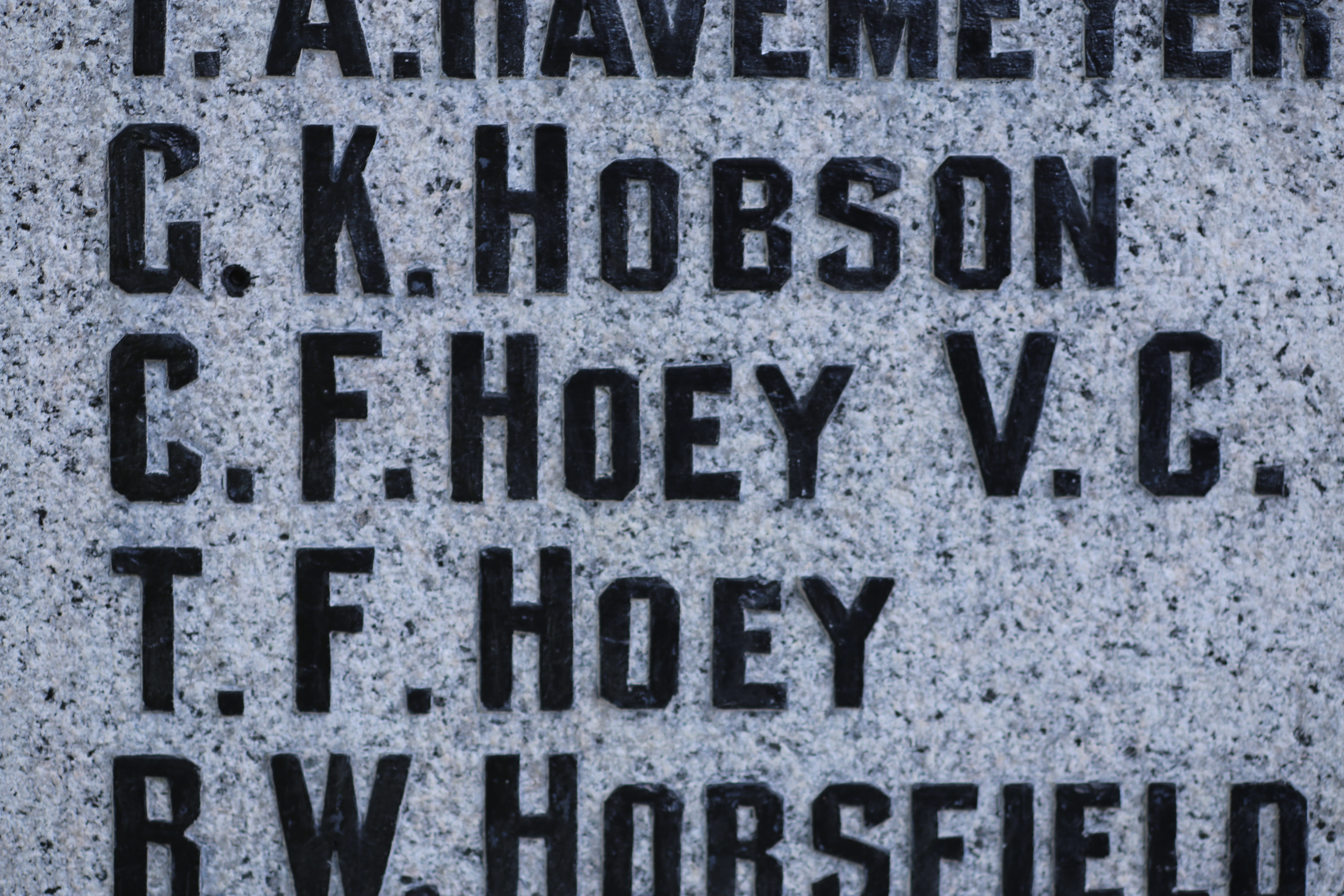
Charles Ferguson Hoey, VC as inscribed on the cenotaph in the Charles F. Hoey VC Memorial Park in downtown Duncan, BC

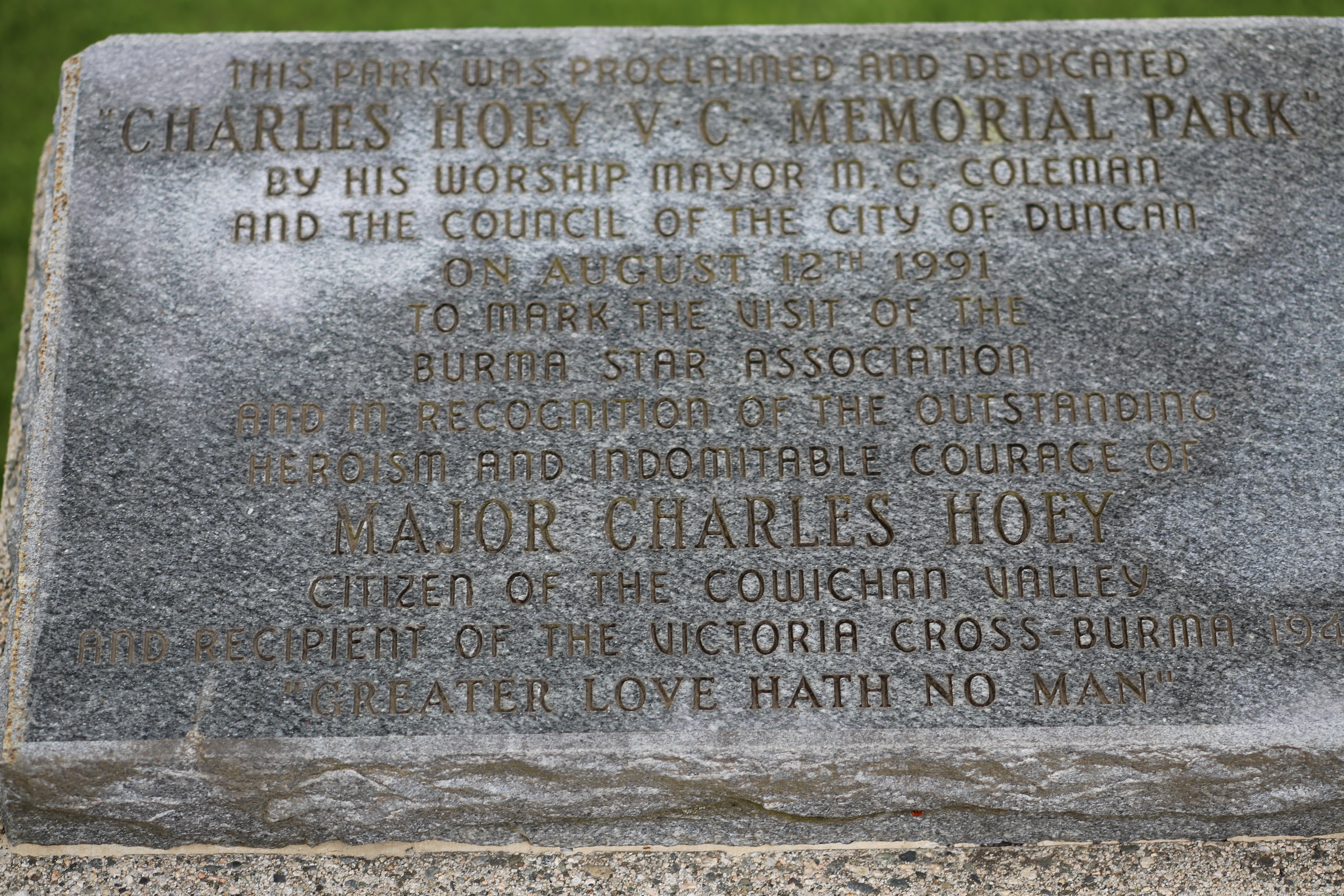
Dedication plaque for Charles F. Hoey VC Memorial Park in Duncan. It reads; "This park was proclaimed and dedicated CHARLES HOEY V.C. MEMORIAL PARK by his worship Mayor M.G. Coleman and by the council of the city of Duncan on August 12th 1991 to mark the visit of the Burma Star Association and in recognition of the outstanding heroism and indomitable courage of MAJOR CHARLES HOEY citizen of the Cowichan Valley and recipient of the Victoria Cross - Burma 1944 GREATER LOVE HATH NO MAN

== See also ==
- Battle of the Admin Box
- British VCs of World War 2 (John Laffin, 1997)
- Monuments to Courage (David Harvey, 1999)
- The Register of the Victoria Cross (This England, 1997)
