= Frank Blaker =

Recipient of the Victoria Cross

Frank Blaker VC MC
- Born: 8 May 1920; Kasauli, Punjab, British India
- Died: 9 July 1944 (aged 24); British Burma
- Burial place: Taukkyan War Cemetery, Burma
- Military career
- Allegiance: United Kingdom
- Branch: British Army
- Service years: 1941–1944
- Rank: Major
- Units: Highland Light Infantry; 9th Gurkha Rifles (attached)
- Conflicts: World War II; Pacific War; Burma campaign; Burma campaign (1944–1945) (DOW)
- Awards: Victoria Cross; Military Cross

Frank Gerald Blaker VC MC (8 May 1920 – 9 July 1944) was a British-Indian recipient of the Victoria Cross, the highest and most prestigious award for gallantry in the face of the enemy that can be awarded to British and Commonwealth forces.

== Details ==
Born in Kasauli, Punjab, India, Blaker was educated at the St. Paul's School, Darjeeling.

Blaker was 24 years old, and a temporary Major in the Highland Light Infantry, British Army, attached to 3rd Battalion, 9th Gurkha Rifles, the khas battalion in the Indian Army during World War II when the following deed took place for which he was awarded the VC.

In Burma on 9th July, 1944, a Company of the 9th Gurkha Rifles was ordered to carry out a wide, encircling movement across unknown and precipitous country, through dense jungle, to attack a strong enemy position on the summit of an important hill overlooking Taungni. Major Blaker carried out this movement with the utmost precision and took up a position with his Company on the extreme right flank of the enemy, in itself a feat of considerable military skill.
Another Company, after bitter fighting, had succeeded in taking the forward edge of the enemy position by a frontal assault, but had failed to reach the main crest of the hill in the face of fierce opposition. At this crucial moment Major Blaker's Company came under heavy and accurate fire at close range from a medium machine gun and two light machine guns, and their advance was also completely stopped.
Major Blaker then advanced ahead of his men through very heavy fire and, in spite of being severely wounded in the arm by a grenade, he located the machine guns, which were the pivot of the enemy defence, and single handed charged the position. When hit by a burst of three rounds through the body, he continued to cheer on his men while lying on the ground. His fearless leadership and outstanding courage so inspired his Company that they stormed the Hill and captured the objective, while the enemy fled in terror into the jungle.
Major Blaker died of wounds while being evacuated from the battlefield. His heroism and self sacrifice were beyond all praise and contributed in no small way to the defeat of the enemy and the successful outcome of the operations.

John Masters, the author, was Blaker's brigade commander. Writing 16 years later, he describes how the brigade was climbing a ridge with great difficulty to take a hill called Point 2171 from a determined and well-led force of Japanese. He resolved to send a force up a neighbouring ridge and required the battalion commander to send his best officer to lead the attack. Both commanders agreed that the best man was Blaker. Next morning he saw off the company and "told Blaker to make bloody sure he was on the right ridge and that he got to the top. Then tried to smile. Blaker really did smile, saw it in the radio light". By this time the whole brigade was nearly exhausted. Moving and climbing in the jungle was very difficult. "It took Jim Blaker an hour and a half to reach the foot of his ridge. Nearly five hours to climb up it. This for a mile and a half without opposition. Near the top he saw that the crest and northern flank of Point 2171 were strongly defended by automatics, woodpecker machine guns and mortars. After sending his message to me and waiting for the covering bombardment, Jim ordered the charge. His leading men came under machine guns firing directly down the ridge. They dived into the dense jungle, tried to crawl up on hands and knees. Men fell, the advance stopped. Jim went forward alone then, firing his carbine, calling 'Come on "C" Company'. Seven machine gun bullets through the stomach. He sank down, against a tree, turned his head, 'Come on "C" Company, I'm going to die. Take the position'. The Gurkhas swept on and up. Bayonets. Ayo Gurkhali, the Gurkhas have come! That night I wrote out the citation for Blaker's Victoria Cross, which was immediately awarded, posthumously".

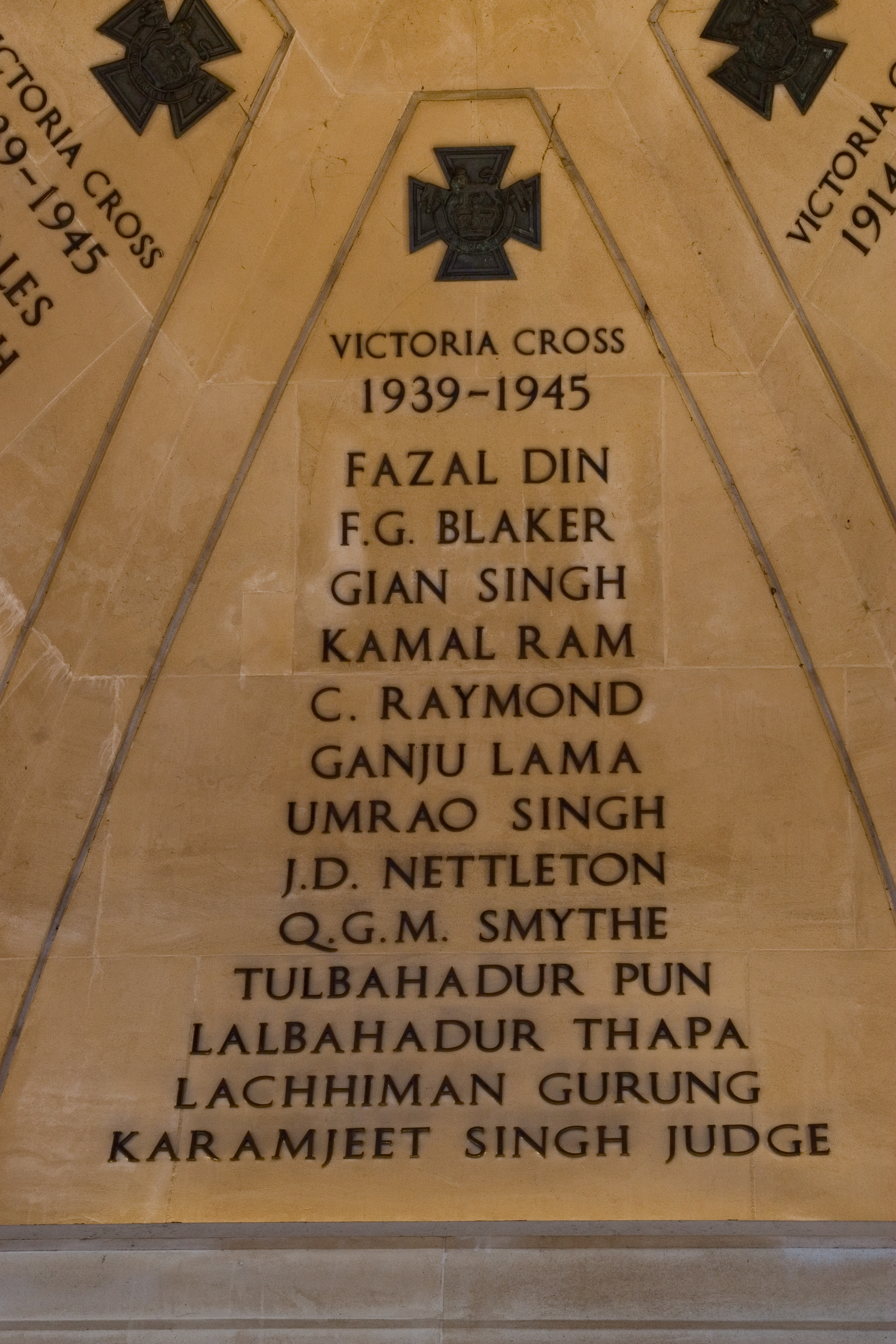
Blaker's name on the "Memorial Gates" at Constitution Hill, London SW1

Blaker died as a result of the wounds he received in this action. His grave is located in the Taukkyan War Cemetery, 20 miles north of Rangoon (now Yangon), Burma (now Myanmar). It is located in Plot VI, Row E, Grave 2.

== Medal entitlement ==

Ribbon	Description	Notes
	Victoria Cross (VC)	1944
	Military Cross (MC)	1943
	1939–1945 Star	
	Burma Star	
	Defence Medal	
	War Medal	

== See also ==
- List of Brigade of Gurkhas recipients of the Victoria Cross

== Bibliography ==
- British VCs of World War 2 (John Laffin, 1997)
- Monuments to Courage (David Harvey, 1999)
- The Register of the Victoria Cross (This England, 1997)
