= November 1944 =

Month of 1944

<<	November 1944					>>
Su	Mo	Tu	We	Th	Fr	Sa
			1	2	3	4
5	6	7	8	9	10	11
12	13	14	15	16	17	18
19	20	21	22	23	24	25
26	27	28	29	30

The following events occurred in November 1944:

== November 1, 1944 (Wednesday) ==
- Action of 1 November 1944: A naval battle was fought in the Kvarner Gulf off Croatia between a Royal Navy destroyer flotilla and a Kriegsmarine force of two corvettes and a destroyer. The result was a British victory as all three German ships were sunk.
- 1 November 1944 reconnaissance sortie over Japan: An American F-13 Superfortress conducted the first flight by Allied aircraft over Japan since the Doolittle Raid of April 1942.
- During the Battle of the Scheldt, British and Canadian forces began Operation Infatuate with the goal of opening the port of Antwerp to shipping.
- Canadian Defence Minister James Ralston resigned his post after Prime Minister William Lyon Mackenzie King rejected Ralston's plea for imposition of the draft for overseas service. The schism within King's cabinet brought about the Conscription Crisis of 1944 which threatened to topple King's government.
- The American destroyer Abner Read was sunk in Leyte Gulf by a Japanese kamikaze attack.
- The British frigate Whitaker was torpedoed and damaged off Malin Head, Ireland by German submarine U-483 and rendered a constructive total loss.
- The play Harvey by Mary Chase premiered on Broadway at the 48th Street Theatre.
- Born:
  - Kinky Friedman, American country singer and satirist, in Chicago (d. 2024)
  - Rafic Hariri, business tycoon and Prime Minister of Lebanon, in Sidon, Lebanon (d. 2005);
  - Bobby Heenan, professional wrestler, manager and commentator, in Chicago, Illinois (d. 2017);
  - Oscar Temaru, President of French Polynesia, in Faaa, Tahiti

== November 2, 1944 (Thursday) ==
- The U.S. Seventh Army took Nompatelize unopposed.
- 50,000 of Budapest's Jews were sent on a forced march to Austria. 10,000 would die over the six-day march.
- Josip Broz Tito became 23rd Prime Minister of Yugoslavia.
- The American tanker Fort Lee was torpedoed and sunk in the Indian Ocean by German submarine U-181.
- Born: Keith Emerson, English keyboardist and composer. (d. 2016)
- Died: Thomas Midgley Jr., 55, American mechanical engineer and chemist

== November 3, 1944 (Friday) ==
- The Japanese began the Fu-Go (fire balloon) campaign against the continental United States.
- Turkey ended blackout restrictions.
- Japanese destroyer Akikaze was torpedoed and sunk west of Cape Bolinao, Philippines by the American submarine Pintado when she intercepted torpedoes intended for the aircraft carrier Jun'yō.

== November 4, 1944 (Saturday) ==
- Australian forces made the Landing at Jacquinot Bay in New Britain.
- RAF Bomber Command sent 749 aircraft to conduct the last major raid on Bochum. Over 4,000 buildings were destroyed and nearly 1,000 people were killed.
- Born: Linda Gary, film and television actress, in Los Angeles, California (d. 1995)
- Died: John Dill, 62, British field marshal (aplastic anaemia)

== November 5, 1944 (Sunday) ==
- British troops in Italy captured Ravenna, cutting the railway line to Bologna.
- The Japanese cruiser Nachi was sunk in Manila Bay by U.S. aircraft.
- Died: Alexis Carrel, 71, French surgeon, biologist and Nobel laureate

== November 6, 1944 (Monday) ==
- The German garrison at Middelburg surrendered to the Allies.
- The Italian government announced the formation of a private army about six divisions strong, to enter into the war on the Allied side.
- The provisional government of France struck down all of the country's anti-Semitic laws. Implementation of this measure was difficult when it came to returning Jews to their former occupations and giving them back their homes and confiscated property.
- In Liverpool, the largest penicillin factory in the world began production.
- Born: Wild Man Fischer, songwriter, in Los Angeles, California (d. 2011)
- Died: Walter Guinness, 1st Baron Moyne, 64, Anglo-Irish politician and businessman (assassinated in Cairo by the Jewish terrorist group Lehi)

== November 7, 1944 (Tuesday) ==
- The 1944 United States presidential election was held. Incumbent Franklin D. Roosevelt was elected to an unprecedented fourth term, defeating Thomas E. Dewey 432 electoral votes to 99 and carrying 36 out of 48 states.
- The Battle of Knin began between Yugoslav Partisans and Axis forces around the city of Knin in North Dalmatia.
- The Air battle over Niš occurred over Niš, Serbia between the Air Forces of the United States and the Soviet Union. For an unknown reason, American P-38s attacked Soviet ground troops and then came under attack themselves from Yak fighters of the Soviet Air Force. It is unclear exactly what happened or why, since documents related to the incident apparently remain classified in both countries.
- The American submarine Albacore struck a mine and sank off Hokkaido.
- 16 people were killed and 50 injured in a train derailment in Puerto Rico.
- Born: Joe Niekro, baseball player, in Martins Ferry, Ohio (d. 2006)
- Died: Hannah Szenes, 23, Hungarian-Jewish SOE paratrooper

== November 8, 1944 (Wednesday) ==
- Joseph Goebbels announced the V-2 rocket campaign for the first time. Winston Churchill followed suit and finally announced that England had been under rocket attack, providing the people of London with an explanation for all the mysterious explosions of recent weeks.
- The Battle of the Scheldt and Operation Infatuate ended in Allied victory.
- The American submarine Growler was sunk west of the Philippines by Japanese warships.

== November 9, 1944 (Thursday) ==
- German troops on Walcharen Island surrendered to the Allies.
- Allied troops in Italy crossed the Montone River.

== November 10, 1944 (Friday) ==
- Nazi occupation forces in the Netherlands began a two-day roundup of 50,000 men in Rotterdam to be sent to Germany for forced labour.
- Allied forces launched Operation Clipper, an offensive to reduce the Geilenkirchen salient.
- The Allies recognized the government of Albanian partisan leader Enver Hoxha.
- The American ammunition ship Mount Hood exploded and sank at Seeadler Harbor, Manus, Admiralty Islands with the loss of all 350 crew.
- German submarine U-537 was torpedoed and sunk in the Java Sea by the American submarine Flounder.
- Born: Askar Akayev, 1st President of Kyrgyzstan, in Kyzyl-Bayrak, Kirghiz SSR, Soviet Union; Silvestre Reyes, politician, in Canutillo, Texas; Tim Rice, lyricist, in Shardeloes
- Died: Wang Jingwei, 61, head of Chinese collaborationists with Japan during the Second Sino-Japanese War (part of WWII)

== November 11, 1944 (Saturday) ==
- The Battle of Batina began in the Croatian village of Batina.
- The series of air-sea engagements collectively referred to as the Battle of Ormoc Bay began in the Camotes Sea in the Philippines. The Japanese destroyers Hamanami, Naganami, Shimakaze and Wakatsuki were bombed and sunk in Ormoc Bay by U.S. Navy aircraft.
- Iwo Jima was bombarded by the U.S. Navy.
- The last remaining German troops in Greece withdrew from the country.
- German submarine U-771 was torpedoed and sunk in Andfjord by British submarine Venturer.
- German submarine U-1200 was depth charged and sunk south of Ireland by British warships.
- The 1942–44 musicians' strike ends in the United States when RCA Victor and Columbia Records capitulate to the union's demands.
- Born: Kemal Sunal, actor, in Istanbul, Turkey (d. 2000)

== November 12, 1944 (Sunday) ==
- Over 10,000 Uyghurs, Kazakhs, Kyrgyz, Uzbeks, Tatars, and some White Russians rally in Ghulja and declare independence as the Second East Turkistan Republic.
- RAF Bomber Command carried out Operation Catechism and, after trying unsuccessfully for months, finally sank the German battleship Tirpitz near Tromsø.
- 80,000 leftists demonstrated in Rome in celebration of the anniversary of the Bolshevik Revolution and denounced the monarchy.
- Forever Amber by Kathleen Winsor hit #1 on the New York Times Fiction Best Sellers list.
- Born: Booker T. Jones, musician, record producer and frontman of Booker T. & the M.G.'s, in Memphis, Tennessee; Al Michaels, sportscaster, in Brooklyn, New York
- Died: George F. Houston, 48, American film actor (heart attack)

== November 13, 1944 (Monday) ==
- The Bulgarian 1st Army captured Skopje.
- The Japanese destroyers Akebono, Akishimo, Hatsuharu and Kiso were all bombed and sunk by U.S. Navy aircraft in and around the Cavite Naval Yard in Manila, while destroyer Okinami was sunk 8 nautical miles west of the city.
- Japanese submarine I-12 was hedgehogged and sunk east of Hawaii by American warships.
- Civil air service returned to London for the first time since September 1939.
- Born: Ron Harris – England association football player' in London Metropolitan Borough of Hackney.

== November 14, 1944 (Tuesday) ==
- Albanian partisans liberated Durrës.
- With the sponsorship of Nazi Germany, the Committee for the Liberation of the Peoples of Russia was founded in Prague by anticommunists from territories of the Soviet Union.
- Nazi resistance members Walter Cramer, Bernhard Letterhaus and Ferdinand von Lüninck were hanged at Plötzensee Prison in Berlin.
- Died: Trafford Leigh-Mallory, 52, British RAF commander (plane crash in the French Alps)

== November 15, 1944 (Wednesday) ==
- The U.S. Fifth Army in Italy captured Modigliana.
- Japanese landing craft depot ship Akitsu Maru was torpedoed and sunk in the Korea Strait by the submarine USS Queenfish, killing over 2,000.
- The war film Thirty Seconds Over Tokyo starring Van Johnson and Robert Walker was released.

== November 16, 1944 (Thursday) ==
- The U.S. First and Ninth Armies began Operation Queen, an offensive at the German Siegfried Line.
- The first Jussi Awards ceremony, recognizing excellence in Finnish film making, were held in Helsinki.
- Born: Colin Harvey, footballer, in Liverpool, England

== November 17, 1944 (Friday) ==
- The British Second Army captured Wessem.
- Japanese aircraft carrier Shin'yō was torpedoed and sunk in the Yellow Sea by the American submarine Spadefish.
- While part of convoy Hi-81, the Japanese landing craft depot ship Mayasan Maru was sunk in the East China Sea by the American submarine Picuda. Some 3,856 lives were lost in one of the highest maritime casualty counts of the war.
- Born: Gene Clark, singer, songwriter and founding member of The Byrds, in Tipton, Missouri (d. 1991); Danny DeVito, actor and filmmaker, in Neptune Township, New Jersey; Rem Koolhaas, architect and urban planner, in Rotterdam, Netherlands; Lorne Michaels, television and film producer, in Toronto, Canada; Tom Seaver, baseball player, in Fresno, California (d. 2020)

== November 18, 1944 (Saturday) ==
- During the Battle of Metz, American forces entered Metz itself.
- Japanese submarine I-41 was sunk off Leyte by American warships and aircraft.
- More Fun Comics issue #101 was published (cover date Jan-Feb), featuring the first appearance of Superboy.
- The Popular Socialist Youth organization was founded in Cuba.
- Prisoner of war Louis Zamperini makes a radio broadcast on Radio Japan to his family and confirmed that he was still alive after reports of his death following the crash of the Green Hornet B-24 Liberator on May 27, 1943.
- Born: Wolfgang Joop, fashion designer, in Potsdam, Germany

== November 19, 1944 (Sunday) ==
- The British Second Army captured Geilenkirchen.
- The American submarine Sculpin was scuttled off Truk after being damaged by Japanese destroyer Yamagumo.
- Born: Dennis Hull, ice hockey player, in Pointe Anne, Ontario, Canada (d. 2026)

== November 20, 1944 (Monday) ==
- Adolf Hitler left his Eastern Front headquarters, the Wolfsschanze ("Wolf's Lair"), for the last time as the Red Army approached the borders of Germany.
- The Kosovo Operation ended in Partisan victory.
- The London districts of Piccadilly, the Strand and Fleet Street turned their lights on after five years of blackout.
- English author P. G. Wodehouse, who had made broadcasts over enemy radio in France during the Nazi occupation, was arrested in Paris.
- The American oil tanker Mississinewa was sunk off Ulithi, Micronesia by a Japanese Kaiten manned torpedo.
- Born: Louie Dampier, Hall of Fame basketball player, in Indianapolis, Indiana; Earl Monroe, Hall of Fame basketball player in Philadelphia, Pennsylvania

== November 21, 1944 (Tuesday) ==
- The French 1st Army captured Belfort.
- The Japanese battlecruiser Kongō and destroyer Urwakaze were torpedoed and sunk in the South China Sea by American submarine USS Sealion.
- Born: Dick Durbin, politician, in East St. Louis, Illinois; Harold Ramis, actor, director, writer and comedian, in Chicago, Illinois (d. 2014)

== November 22, 1944 (Wednesday) ==
- Operation Clipper ended in Allied victory.
- Canadian Parliament assembled in a special meeting to debate the conscription crisis. Prime Minister William Lyon Mackenzie King said that it had not become necessary to require drafted troops to serve overseas and that to do so "would occasion the most serious controversy that could arise in Canada. I can think of no course fraught with greater danger to our war effort, to say nothing of the unity and strength of Canada today and for generations to come, than a general election at this late stage of the war on the conscription issue. Until it is apparent conscription for overseas forces is necessary, the government would not be justified in taking the risk of widespread national dissention."
- The British submarine Stratagem was depth charged and sunk in the Strait of Malacca by the Japanese submarine chaser CH 35.
- The film Henry V, adapted from the William Shakespeare play of the same name premiered in the United Kingdom. The film starred Laurence Olivier, who also directed.
- The musical film Meet Me in St. Louis starring Judy Garland and Margaret O'Brien premiered in St. Louis, Missouri.
- Died: Joseph Caillaux, 81, French politician; Arthur Eddington, 61, English astronomer, physicist and mathematician

== November 23, 1944 (Thursday) ==
- French forces effected the symbolically important Liberation of Strasbourg.
- U.S. troops liberated the Natzweiler-Struthof concentration camp in France.
- The Canadian cabinet made 16,000 conscripts available for overseas duty.

== November 24, 1944 (Friday) ==
- The Battle of Guilin–Liuzhou during the Second Sino-Japanese War ended in Japanese victory.
- The Baltic Offensive and the Moonsund Landing Operation ended in Soviet victory.
- The government of Ferenc Szálasi in Hungary fled Budapest to escape encirclement by the Soviets and re-established itself in Sopron.
- The Terrace Mutiny began when Canadian soldiers based in Terrace, British Columbia began disobeying orders and seizing weapons after hearing rumors that conscripts might be deployed overseas. The mutiny was largely censored by authorities and it did not come to be well known by the general public.
- About 1,000 Canadian soldiers from the military camp in Vernon, British Columbia paraded through the city shouting, "Down with conscription."
- Born: Candy Darling, transgender actress and Warhol Superstar, née James Lawrence Slattery in Forest Hills, Queens, New York (d. 1974); Ibrahim Gambari, scholar and diplomat, in Ilorin, Nigeria

== November 25, 1944 (Saturday) ==
- A German V-2 rocket struck the intersection of High Holborn and Chancery Lane in the Holborn section of London, killing 6 and wounding 292. Then, in the worst V-2 attack of the war, another one landed across the street from the Woolworths department store in New Cross, South London and killed 168.
- German submarine U-482 was sunk west of Shetland by the Royal Navy frigate Ascension.
- The American aircraft carrier Intrepid (CV-11) is struck by two Kamikaze attacks, killing 69 crewmembers.
- The Canadian corvette Shawinigan was torpedoed and sunk in the Cabot Strait by German submarine U-1228.
- Japanese cruiser Yasoshima (formerly the Chinese cruiser Ping Hai) was bombed and sunk in Drusol Bay, Luzon by American aircraft.
- Japanese cruiser Kumano was sunk at Santa Cruz, Philippines by American aircraft.
- Japanese destroyer Shimotsuki was torpedoed and sunk northeast of Singapore by the American submarine Cavalla.
- Born: Ben Stein, writer, lawyer, actor and commentator, in Washington, D.C.; Michael Kijana Wamalwa, 8th Vice President of Kenya, in Sosio, Kenya (d. 2003)
- Died: Kenesaw Mountain Landis, 78, American judge and the first Commissioner of Baseball

== November 26, 1944 (Sunday) ==
- The U.S. Seventh Army captured Steige and Villé.
- Heinrich Himmler ordered the destruction of the crematoria at Auschwitz concentration camp to eliminate evidence of the mass killings there.
- Died: Florence Foster Jenkins, 76, American socialite and amateur operatic soprano famous for her lack of singing ability.

== November 27, 1944 (Monday) ==
- The Battle of Peleliu ended in American victory.
- RAF Fauld explosion: A military accident occurred at the RAF Fauld underground munitions storage depot east of Hanbury, Staffordshire, killing about 90 people.
- The Norwegian prisoner ship Rigel was bombed and sunk in the Norwegian Sea by Fairey Barracuda aircraft of the Fleet Air Arm. 2,571 people were killed.
- German submarine U-479 was sunk by a Soviet naval mine in the Gulf of Finland.
- A V-2 flying bomb killed 157 people in Antwerp.

== November 28, 1944 (Tuesday) ==
- The Allies began to operate the port of Antwerp.
- The 57th Army of the 3rd Ukrainian Front captured the Hungarian town of Mohács.
- German submarine U-80 was lost with all hands in a diving accident off Pillau.

== November 29, 1944 (Wednesday) ==
- The Battle of Batina ended in Allied victory.
- Japanese aircraft carrier Shinano was torpedoed and sunk southeast of Kushimoto by the American submarine Archerfish.
- The Terrace Mutiny ended when officers led by George Pearkes restored order.
- French Canadian nationalist René Chaloult said during a political meeting that Quebec should secede from Canada if the province was not allowed to decide its own policies on conscription.
- The liberation of Albania is completed as the National Liberation Movement of Albania reconquers Shkodër.
- The first Blalock–Thomas–Taussig shunt was performed in Baltimore.

== November 30, 1944 (Thursday) ==
- The 53rd Army of the 2nd Ukrainian Front took the Hungarian city of Eger.
- A German V-2 rocket struck Shooter's Hill in South East London at 1:00 a.m., killing 23.
- Born: George Graham, footballer and manager, in Bargeddie, Scotland
- Died: Eoin O'Duffy, 52, Irish political activist, soldier and police commissioner
