= Clarence T. "Curly" Edwinson =

American World War II flying ace and skeet shooter

Clarence T. Edwinson
- Born: July 1, 1912; Valley Falls, Kansas, U.S.
- Died: June 10, 1985 (aged 72)
- Military career
- Allegiance: United States
- Branch: United States Army Air Forces; United States Air Force
- Service years: c. 1934–1960
- Rank: Brigadier General
- Commands: Squadron Officer School; 30th Air Division; 42d Air Division; 3902nd Air Base Wing; 86th Fighter Wing; 27th Fighter Group; Lechfield Air Base; 366th Fighter Group; Bluethenthal Field; 82nd Fighter Group; 412th Base Unit
- Conflicts: World War II
- Awards: Distinguished Flying Cross; Air Medal (4); Croix de guerre (France)

Brigadier General Clarence Theodore Edwinson (July 1, 1912 – June 10, 1985) was an American fighter pilot and flying ace of World War II, a collegiate football star and a world champion skeet shooter. He is alternatively referred to as C.T. Edwinson in many sources as he disliked the name "Clarence." His superiors and peers referred to him as "Curly" and he was also known to his subordinates as "Big Ed."

== Early life ==
Edwinson was born on July 1, 1912, and attended school in Topeka, Kansas, graduating from Topeka High School in 1929. He next attended Washburn College where he was a member of the Kansas Beta Chapter of Phi Delta Theta.

== Athletic prowess ==
Throughout his life Edwinson was an accomplished athlete. At Washburn University he was a four-year letterman in football and in 1932 was named to the All Central Conference team as running back and was an honorable mention for the AP All American team. He also lettered in basketball in 1929. "The 1933 Washburn yearbook described him as 'probably the greatest halfback ever to play for Washburn.'" Washburn coach Ernest Bearg said that Edwinson is "one of the best back in the United States. He is exceptional as a ball carrier, blocker, passer and defensive safety or halfback. In my 17 years of coaching I have had only two backs that could compare with those were Red Grange of Illinois and Glen Presnell of Nebraska."

As an Air Force colonel in 1952, Edwinson won a gold medal in skeet shooting at the ISSF World Shooting Championships in Oslo, Norway, scoring a perfect 150/150.

In 1970, Washburn inducted him into its Athletics Hall of Fame. Topeka High School inducted the general into its hall of fame in 1988–89 labeling him "a colorful figure on the gridiron and in the air".

== Early military career ==
Enlisting as a flying cadet in February 1934, Edwinson took his flying training and continued as a flying cadet until February 29, 1936, when he was commissioned a second lieutenant in the Reserve, and assigned to Barksdale Field, Louisiana. From July 1937 to December 1940 he served as an instructor and flight commander at Randolph Field, Texas, and then went to Pursuit School at Craig Field, Alabama.

Going to England as a military observer with the Fighter Command of the Royal Air Force during the Battle of Britain, Edwinson returned to the United States in March 1942, to become group operations officer at Dale Mabry Field, Florida. In December of that year he enrolled as a student at the Command and General Staff School, Fort Leavenworth, Kansas, and graduated the following February.

== World War II ==
Immediately thereafter, Edwinson assumed command of a fighter wing at Drew Army Air Field, Florida, and in May 1943, went to Alaska as executive officer of the Eleventh Air Force. That October he was appointed wing executive officer to the San Francisco Fighter Wing in California, and in April 1944 assumed command of the 412th Base Unit at Seattle, Washington, moving the unit to Portland, Oregon.

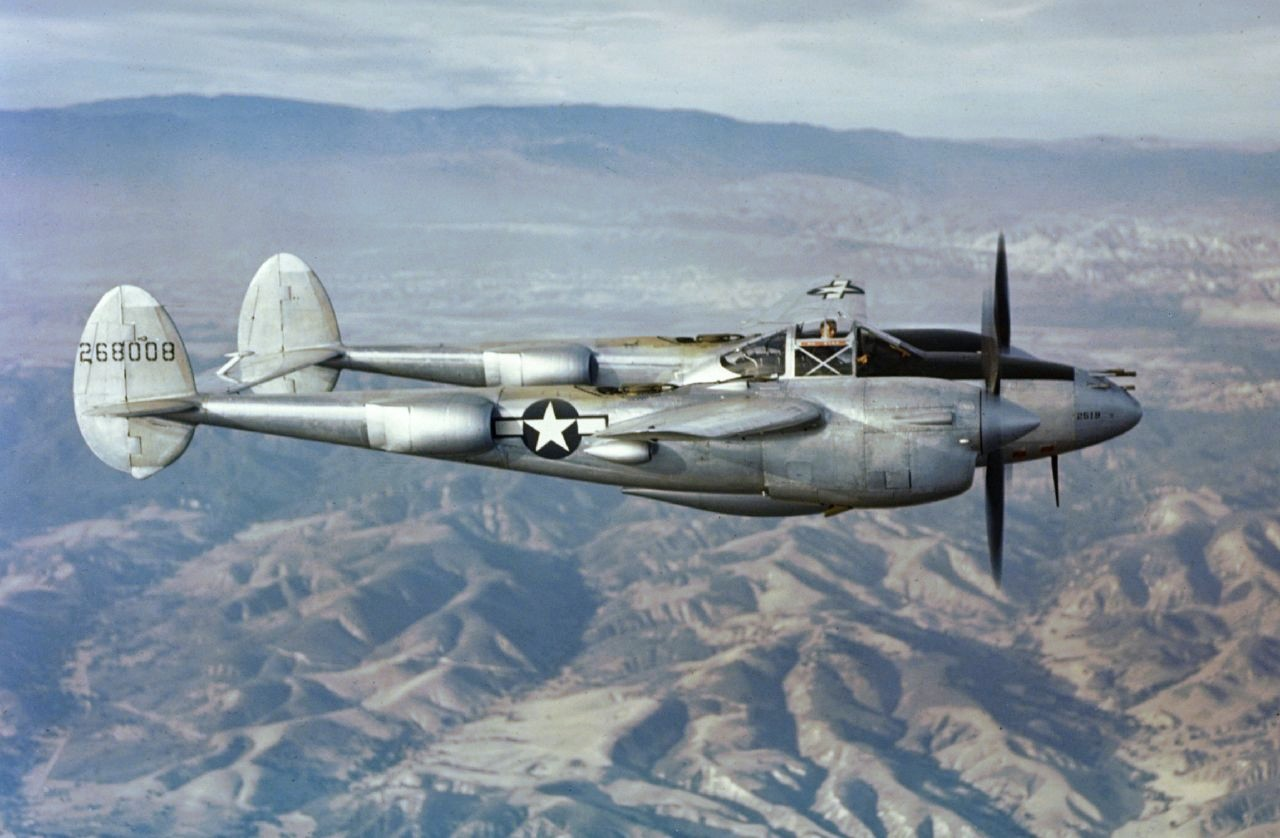
A P-38 like the one flown by Curly Edwinson during World War II flying over California

Moving to Italy in August 1944, General Edwinson was designated commander of the 82nd Fighter Group. According to one source, Edwinson led the first all-fighter shuttle mission to Russia. Air Force records, however, show this first shuttle mission did not occur until July 22, 1944.

== The Niš incident ==
Edwinson was in command during the Niš incident on 7 November 1944, when he and his pilots strafed a Soviet convoy, killing an allied general and dozens of other troops, and shot down two Soviet Yaks.

The battle started when Edwinson's fighters strafed a Red Army convoy and airbase near Niš, Yugoslavia, prompting an air battle with responding Soviet Air Force fighters. More than 30 Russian soldiers were killed on the ground. Two American P-38 Lightning and two Soviet Yak-9 fighters were shot down in the air battle, and a third Yak-9 fell to Soviet antiaircraft fire.

Due to the death of Red Army general Grigory Kotov, the incident caused diplomatic tension that was resolved only when Soviet officials accepted the American explanation that the attack was a mistake caused by navigational error. Despite the official Soviet conclusion, postwar Soviet memoirs claimed that the American attack was intentional.

Edwinson did not report the incident to his superiors and instead went on leave. Three days later, on 10 November, Red Army deputy chief of the General Staff General Aleksey Antonov reported the incident to Major General John R. Deane, chief of the American military mission in Moscow. In his report, Antonov stated there were 27 attacking Lightnings (the Americans say 12). Edwinson was reassigned stateside after an investigation.

The United States apologized to the Soviet Union, stating that the attack was the result of a grave error by American pilots sent to attack German forces on the road from Skopje to Pristina. On 14 December, American ambassador to the Soviet Union W. Averell Harriman apologized on behalf of Franklin D. Roosevelt and George C. Marshall and offered to send liaison officers to the 3rd Ukrainian Front to prevent further incidents; Stalin rejected it, because a line of demarcation had been drawn indicating the boundaries of Allied air actions.

An American perspective of the incident is described in Combat Aircraft of World War II by Glenn B. Bavousett:

The first engagement occurred in early November 1944, over Yugoslavia. Russian ground forces had the Germans in retreat. The 15th Air Force was requested to provide close air support. Colonel C.T. "Curly" Edwinson's (now General; Ret.) 82nd Fighter Group operating from Foggia Italy, caught the mission. The Husky P-38's performance was so good that the Russians asked for a repeat support mission to be flown by the same group the following day. Again Edwinson led his three squadrons of P-38s across the Adriatic and down into the valleys of mountainous Yugoslavia.

Unknown to Edwinson a crisis was in the making. The Russians had failed to advise Foggia that during the interval between the previous day's support mission and now, Russian Ground forces had advanced the battle line by 100 kilometers. Edwinson led the P-38's into the strafing attack that ripped first into the Germans then immediately into the Russians. The resulting devastation was both massive and effective. Caught in the strafing was a Russian staff car. Its occupant, a three-star general [Lt.Gen. G.P. Kotov, commander of XI Guards Rifle Corps], was killed, a victim of lack of communications and a close similarity between German and Russian Uniforms and vehicle color schemes. And with the P-38's speed these differences went unnoticed.

A flight of Yaks were in the vicinity and the call went out for them to attack the P-38s still busy making strafing runs. Caught totally by surprise, Edwinson saw two of his aircraft being shot down. Instantly he signaled the squadron to disengage from ground attack and fight their way out of the valley. During a brief air battle that ensued Edwinson's P-38 pilots knocked down four of the Yaks [note: the actual number was two] and sent the remainder scurrying away into the haze. One of the four Yaks that really got it was the unlucky fellow whose course took him directly over the guns of a P-38 piloted by Bill Blurock who was in a stall condition and but a few yards under the Russian. A touch of the button and the Yak was literally ripped to shreds.

Writing during the Cold War, Bavousett painted the encounter as a type of 'victory' for the Americans:

This incident over Yugoslavia gave the United States a 4-to-2 edge in the only known aerial combat between the two powers (the 1950 engagement involved North Korean Pilots). When advised that the situation was one of those unfortunate happening that bad communications sometimes foster... "Curly" Edwinson was quietly and hastily re-assigned to a base out of Europe.

Lee K. Carr in "Air Classics" (Volume 38, Number 8) has a different take on the incident, blaming Edwinson for poor planning and communication.

The following January, Edwinson went to Bluethenthal Army Air Field, North Carolina, as deputy base commanding officer, and on March 13, 1945, assumed command of the base. On October 21, 1945, he became deputy base commanding officer of Shaw AAF, South Carolina. By the end of the war he had flown 30 combat missions and 13,000 hours.

== Post-war service ==
The following May, Edwinson assumed command of the 366th Fighter Group at Fritzlar Air Base, Germany, and that November was named commander of Lechfeld Air Base. In February 1947, he returned to Fritzlar AB as commanding officer of the 27th Fighter Group, and on July 21 of that year assumed command of the 86th Composite Group (1948: 86th Fighter Group) at Bad Kissengen Air Base, Germany. At that time the 86th was the only combat-capable fighter group of the USAF in Europe. General Curtis LeMay regarded Edwinson as his best combat commander during this period. LeMay planned to use Edwinson's P-47's if he needed to take offensive actions to keep Berlin supplied. On July 1, 1948, the group became part of the newly activated 86th Fighter Wing, and Edwinson moved up to command the wing.

Returning to the United States in June 1949, Edwinson became base and wing commanding officer of the 3902nd Air Base Wing, Strategic Air Command, at Offutt Air Force Base, Nebraska. On April 6, 1951, he assumed command of the 42d Air Division, SAC, at Bergstrom Air Force Base, Texas. The general became special assistant to the commander, Second Air Force, SAC, at Bergstrom AFB, on June 30, 1957. He was promoted to brigadier general on December 15, 1953.

Joining the Air Defense Command, on August 15, 1957, Edwinson was assigned duty as commander of the 30th Air Division (Defense), Eastern Air Defense Force, with station at Willow Run Air Force Station, Michigan, with additional duty on August 17 as commander, 30th Continental Air Defense Division.

On June 10, 1958, he was relieved from additional duty as commander, 30th CONAD Division and assigned additional duty as commander, 30th NORAD (CONAD) Division, Belleville, Mich. His last duty assignment was as commander of the Air Force's Squadron Officer School. He retired from active duty in 1961 to Austin, Texas. The general is buried in the Fort Sam Houston National Cemetery.

Edwinson's decorations include the Distinguished Flying Cross, Air Medal with three oak leaf clusters and the French Croix de Guerre with Palm. He was rated a command pilot.

== Sources ==
- Glantz, David M.; Maslov, Aleksandr A. (1998). "How and why did the Americans kill Soviet general Kotov?". Journal of Slavic Military Studies. 11 (2): 142–171. doi:10.1080/13518049808430344.
- Myers, Harold P. (March 1987). "The Kotov Affair and the Road to Yalta". Military Affairs. 51 (4): 188–192. doi:10.2307/1987948. JSTOR 1987948.
