= Aleksandr Koldunov =

Soviet flying ace in the Second World War (1923–1992)

Alexander Ivanovich Koldunov
- Александр Иванович Колдунов
- Born: 20 September 1923; Moshchinovo, Smolensky Uyezd, Smolensk Governorate, Russian SFSR, Soviet Union
- Died: 7 June 1992 (aged 68); Moscow, Russia
- Military career
- Allegiance: USSR
- Branch: Soviet Air Force; Soviet Air Defence Force
- Rank: Chief marshal of aviation
- Commands: Soviet Air Defence Forces
- Conflicts: World War II
- Awards: Hero of the Soviet Union (twice)

Alexander Ivanovich Koldunov (Russian: Александр Иванович Колдунов; 20 September 1923 – 7 June 1992) was one of the highest-scoring flying aces of the Soviet Union during World War II and twice a recipient of the title Hero of the Soviet Union.

== Early life ==
Koldunov was born on 20 September 1923 to a Russian family. In 1931 the family moved to the Moscow area, and in 1940 he completed his ninth grade of school in addition to graduating from the local aeroclub. Koldunov joined the Soviet Army in February 1941. He graduated from the Kacha Military Aviation School in 1943 and was assigned to the 8th Reserve Aviation Regiment before being sent to the war front.

== World War II ==
In May 1943 Koldunov was transferred to the 866th Fighter Aviation Regiment and deployed to the war front.

He was first awarded the title Hero of the Soviet Union on 2 August 1944, having been nominated for the title on 22 May 1944 for his first 15 shootdowns.

On 7 November 1944 he was credited with shooting down of three USAAF P-38 Lightnings of the 82nd Fighter Group in a 'friendly fire' incident near Belgrade during the air battle over Niš. In that episode he defended a column of Soviet ground troops that came under attack by American fighters. Accounts on the number of American and Soviet casualties widely vary, but it is certain that among the Soviet troops on the ground who were killed was lieutenant-general Grigory Kotov.

By the end of the war, he had flown 412 sorties, fought in 96 aerial engagements, gained one shared shootdown and 46 solo victories. He was nominated for the title of Hero of the Soviet Union again on 12 June 1945, but it was not awarded until 23 February 1948.

== Postwar ==
Remaining in military service after the war, he transferred from the Soviet Air Force to the Soviet Air Defence Force in the early 1960s. Koldunov was appointed as the Commander of the Moscow Air Defence District in November 1970. After a promotion to Colonel-General in 1972, in December 1975 Koldunov became the First Deputy Chief of the Air Defence Forces. In 1977 he was promoted to Marshal of Aviation and the following year Koldunov was appointed to command the entire Air Defence Force. In 1984 he was promoted to Chief Marshal of Aviation, one of only a handful of officers to hold this very senior rank.

Koldunov was dismissed in May 1987 after Mathias Rust, a civilian German pilot flew from Finland to Moscow and landed nearby the Red Square. Koldunov died on 7 June 1992 and was buried at Novodevichy Cemetery in Moscow.

== Awards and honors ==
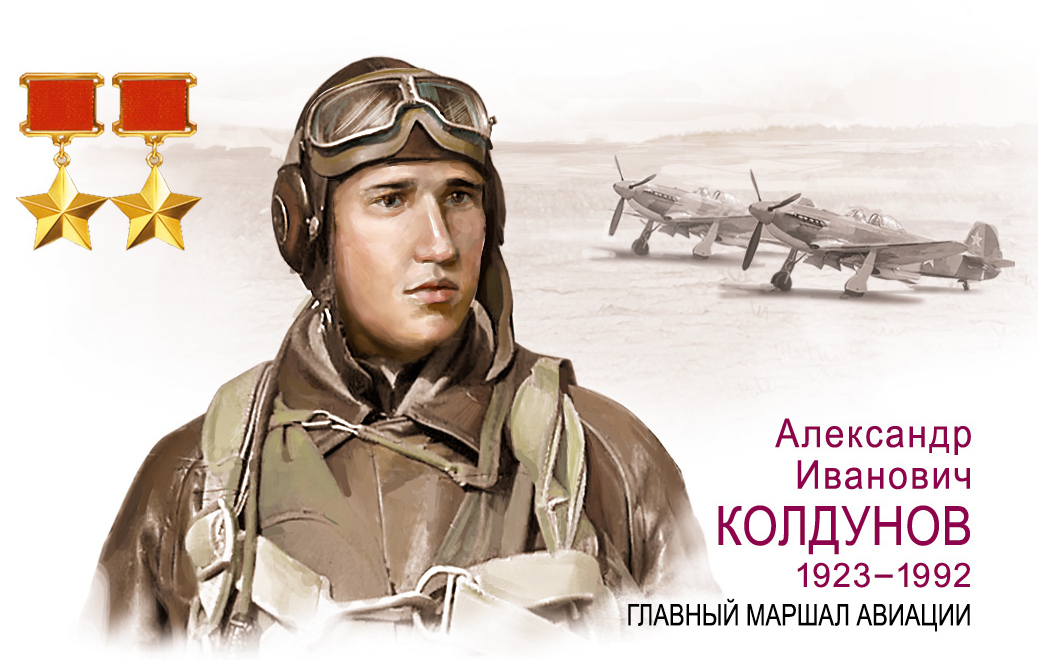
Koldunov on a 2023 postal cover of Russia

=== Soviet ===
- Twice Hero of the Soviet Union
- Three Order of Lenin
- Six Order of the Red Banner
- Order of Alexander Nevsky
- Two Order of the Patriotic War 1st class
- Order of the Red Star
- Lenin Prize

=== Foreign states ===
- Yugoslavia – Order of the Partisan Star 2nd class
- East Germany – Patriotic Order of Merit 2nd class
- Bulgaria – Order of the People's Republic 2nd class
- Bulgaria – Order of Georgi Dimitrov
- Romania – Order of Tudor Vladimirescu 5th class
- Mongolia – Medal "For Military Merit"
- Hungary – Order of the Flag
- Vietnam – Military Exploit Order

== Bibliography ==
- Boyne, Walter J. (2002). Air Warfare: an International Encyclopedia: A-L. ABC-CLIO. ISBN 9781576073452.
- Simonov, Andrey; Bodrikhin, Nikolai (2017). Боевые лётчики — дважды и трижды Герои Советского Союза [Combat pilots — twice and thrice Heroes of the Soviet Union] (in Russian). Moscow: Russian Knights Foundation and Vadim Zadorozhny Museum of Technology. ISBN 9785990960510. OCLC 1005741956.

Military offices
Preceded by Pavel Batitsky	Commander-in-Chief of Soviet Air Defence Forces; 1978 - 1987	Succeeded by Ivan Tretyak
