= October 1944 =

Month of 1944

<<	October 1944					>>
Su	Mo	Tu	We	Th	Fr	Sa
1	2	3	4	5	6	7
8	9	10	11	12	13	14
15	16	17	18	19	20	21
22	23	24	25	26	27	28
29	30	31

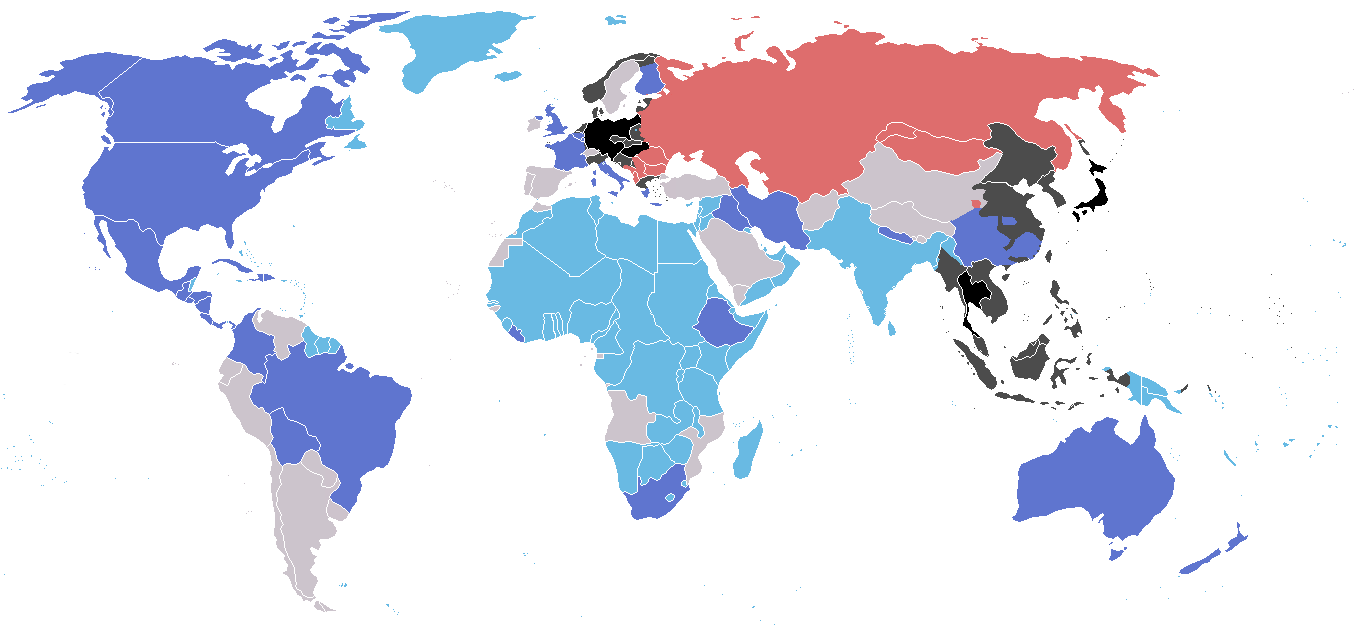
World War 2 in October 1944

The following events occurred in October 1944:

== October 1, 1944 (Sunday) ==
- The Battle of Tornio began between German and Finnish forces.
- Operation Undergo ended in Allied victory.
- Putten raid happened from October 1st to 2nd 660 men were taken away after a failed attack on a German official in November 1944
- After a four-day battle, the U.S. Fifth Army captured Monte Battaglia on the Gothic Line in Italy, helped by the Italian partisans. The II and the IV Corp of the Army launch an offensive towards Bologna, that will end in a month with heavy losses and a limited gain of ground.
- Richard McCreery replaced Oliver Leese as Commander-in-Chief of the Eighth Army.
- The St. Louis Browns won the American League pennant on the final day of the season by beating the New York Yankees 5-2. The Browns, who had never won a pennant in franchise history and would not win another as a St. Louis team, were helped immensely by the wartime roster depletion across baseball that happened to affect them less than the other ballclubs. The average major league team had ten 4-F players on its roster, but the Browns had eighteen.
- Died: Rudolf Schmundt, 48, German Army officer (died of wounds sustained in the 20 July bomb plot)

== October 2, 1944 (Monday) ==
- The Warsaw Uprising was put down after two months by Nazi occupation forces.
- The Battle of Aachen began between American and German forces in and around Aachen, Germany.
- The Battle of the Scheldt began in northern Belgium and the southwestern Netherlands.
- Born: Vernor Vinge, computer scientist and author, in Waukesha, Wisconsin (d. 2024)

== October 3, 1944 (Tuesday) ==
- The Japanese submarine I-177 was shelled and sunk in the Pacific Ocean by the destroyer escort Samuel S. Miles.
- The American submarine USS Seawolf went missing, probably sunk in the Molucca Sea by the U.S. destroyer escort Richard M. Rowell in a friendly fire accident.
- Finnish forces captured Taivalkoski in northern Finland.
- In Lenno, on Lake Como, some partisans attempted to kidnap Guido Buffarini Guidi, the fascist Italian Social Republic's Minister of the Interior. The action ended tragically, with the deaths of five partisans.

== October 4, 1944 (Wednesday) ==
- In Finnish Lapland the Germans moved from Operation Birke to Operation Nordlicht, an organized retreat using scorched earth tactics.
- The Battle of Morotai ended in Allied victory, although intermittent fighting continued there until the end of the war.
- Allied planes bombed Prague for the first time.
- German submarines U-92, U-228 and U-437 were all rendered inoperable by an air raid on Bergen by RAF aircraft.
- Milan Nedić's collaborationist puppet government of the Axis powers, the Government of National Salvation in Nazi-occupied Serbia, was disbanded.
- Born: Danilo Abbruciati, nicknamed “the chameleon”, Italian gangster and hit man, member of the “Banda della Magliana”, in Rome d. 1982, killed by a security guard while he was carrying out an attack on Roberto Calvi’s behalf; Tony La Russa, baseball player and manager, in Tampa, Florida; Ross Milne, Australian Olympic Alpine skier, in Myrtleford, Victoria, Australia (d. 1964, training crash at Winter Olympics)
- Died: Al Smith, 70, American statesman, Governor of New York and 1928 Democratic presidential candidate

== October 5, 1944 (Thursday) ==
- Japanese forces captured Fuzhou, the last seaport under Chinese control.
- The Battle of Memel began on the Eastern Front.
- Joseph Goebbels announced a reduction in food rations.
- The incomplete Italian aircraft carrier Sparviero was scuttled at Genoa by Axis forces.
- In Italy, the IV Corp of the Fifth Army launched an attack towards La Spezia.
- End of the Marzabotto massacre, on the Apennines over Boronia, aimed to repress the support of the villagers to partisan brigade Red Star. In a week, the 16th SS Panzergrenadier Division Reichsführer-SS, headed by Walter Reder, had slaughtered 770 civilians (women and children included) in the territories of Marzabotto, Grizzana and Monzuno, with episodes of inenarrable sadism.
- Five pilots of No. 401 Squadron RCAF participated in the shooting down of a Messerschmitt Me 262 over the Netherlands, marking the first time that a jet fighter had been shot down by enemy fire.
- The stage musical Bloomer Girl with music by Harold Arlen, lyrics by Yip Harburg and book by Sig Herzig and Fred Saidy premiered at the Shubert Theatre on Broadway.
- Born: Gianni Mazza, Italian conductor and composer of jazz and pop music, in Rome; Cesare Nosiglia, Archbishop of Turin, in Rossiglione (Genoa)

== October 6, 1944 (Friday) ==
- The Dutch submarine Zwaardvisch torpedoed and sank German submarine U-168 in the Java Sea.
- Milan Nedić, president of the Serbian collaborationist puppet state of the Axis powers, the Government of National Salvation, fled from Belgrade in Nazi-occupied Serbia by air together with other Serbian collaborators and German officials, via Hungary to Austria.
- The Battle of Debrecen began in Hungary.
- The Dumbarton Oaks Conference concluded.
- Born: Mylon LeFevre, singer, in Gulfport, Mississippi (d. 2023)

== October 7, 1944 (Saturday) ==
- The Dumbarton Oaks Conference concluded.
- Egypt, Iraq, Syria, Jordan and Lebanon signed the Alexandria Protocol, leading to the establishment of the Arab League on March 22, 1945.
- The Red Army began the Petsamo–Kirkenes Offensive against Axis forces in Finland and Norway.
- On the Italian front, the V Corps of the British Eighth Army launched an offensive beyond the river Rubicon.
- Sonderkommando revolt: The Sonderkommando (Nazi death camp prisoners deployed to remove corpses from the gas chambers and burn them) at Auschwitz-Birkenau revolted with makeshift weapons. Three SS guards were killed, but more than 200 members of the Sonderkommando died in the fighting. Hundreds of prisoners escaped but were all soon captured and executed.
- "You Always Hurt the One You Love" by The Mills Brothers topped the Billboard singles charts.
- Dead: Arnaldo Faustin, 72, Italian polar geographer.

== October 8, 1944 (Sunday) ==
- The Battle of Crucifix Hill was fought outside the German village of Haaren, resulting in American victory.
- The Battle of Tehumardi was fought at night on the Estonian island of Saaremaa between retreating German troops and a Soviet Estonian rifle division. Both sides fought blindly, firing into the darkness or feeling for the enemy by touch.
- The Battle of Tornio ended in German retreat.
- The Battle of Turda ended in Romanian-Soviet victory.
- Battle of the Nijmegen salient ended - the Germans were unable to recover lost ground taken by the Allies during Operation Market Garden.
- Sir William Jowitt was appointed Britain's first Minister of National Insurance.
- Died: Nicolò Cortese, 37, Italian priest, killed in Trieste by the Gestapo’s torturers for his help to Jews and partisans; called "the Italian Father Kolbe"; Wendell Willkie, 52, American lawyer, corporate executive and 1940 Republican presidential candidate (heart attack).

== October 9, 1944 (Monday) ==
- The Fourth Moscow Conference began. Winston Churchill, Joseph Stalin and U.S. ambassador W. Averell Harriman met to discuss the future of Europe.
- Operation Loyton ended.
- During the Battle of the Scheldt, the 9th Canadian Infantry Brigade made an amphibious landing on the south bank of the Western Scheldt.
- The St. Louis Cardinals defeated the St. Louis Browns 3-1 to win the 1944 World Series, four games to two.
- Born: John Entwistle, bass player for The Who, in Chiswick, London, England (d. 2002); Nona Hendryx, musician, in Trenton, New Jersey

== October 10, 1944 (Tuesday) ==
- Six Japanese midget submarines were bombed and sunk at Unten, Okinawa by Grumman F6F Hellcats from the carrier USS Bunker Hill.
- Allied commando unit Z Special Unit began Operation Rimau, an attack on Japanese shipping in Singapore Harbor.
- Porajmos: 800 Romani children were murdered at Auschwitz.
- A delegation of Austrian industrialists and officers asked Reichsstatthalter Baldur von Schirach to declare Vienna an open city.
- On the Italian front, while the Wehrmacht stopped the offensive of the II American Corp on the Bologna Apennines in Livergnano, the V English Corp passed the Rubicon and conquers Longiano and Savignano.
- In Genoa, the explosion of a German ammunition deposit in the San Benigno quarter (caused by lightning or, according to some never confirmed theories, by a partisan attack) caused hundreds of deaths. The victims included German soldiers, Genoese civilians living in the area and refugees in air-raid shelters.
- In Piedmont, a coalition of "blue" (monarchist) and "red" (communist) partisans occupied Alba, without fighting; the blue ranks included the future writer Beppe Fenoglio, who would describe the event in his novels. The town became the most important urban center freed by the Resistance's forces, before being reconquered by the Fascists a month later.
- Ramón Grau took office as President of Cuba.
- Born: Eurig Wyn, Welsh politician (died 2019)

== October 11, 1944 (Wednesday) ==
- The U.S. Air Force bombed Okinawa.
- The Soviets annexed the Tuvan People's Republic.
- The Soviet 2nd Ukrainian Front captured Cluj and Szeged.
- A secret Hungarian delegation signed a ceasefire agreement in Moscow. Hungary agreed to declare war on Germany and give up all territory gained since 1937.
- Italian front: While the tenacious opposition of the Wehrmacht stopped the American offensive on the Boronia hills in Livergnano and at Monte Battaglia, on Romagna the British, Indian and Canadian troops passed the Rubicon at many points, directed to Cesena; the New Zealanders conquered Gatteo.
- The film noir Laura directed by Otto Preminger and starring Gene Tierney and Dana Andrews was released.
- The Howard Hawks-directed wartime romance/adventure film To Have and Have Not starring Humphrey Bogart, Walter Brennan and Lauren Bacall (in her film debut) premiered in New York City.
- Died: Fritz Feßmann, 30, German military officer (killed near Tilsit by a Soviet shell)

== October 12, 1944 (Thursday) ==
- The Battle of Rovaniemi began between German and Finnish forces.
- The British destroyer Loyal struck a mine in the Tyrrhenian Sea and was rendered a constructive total loss.
- The attacks of the American Fifth Army were stopped at Mount Cavallara; the offensive to Bologna was temporarily suspended, at 20 kilometres (12 mi) by the target.
- The Japanese Kido Butai and the entire Japanese air forces launched nearly everything they had left at the American invasion force heading to Leyte, as part of their Sho 1 plan to repel American invasion toward Japan. The IJN planes failed to do any significant damage and were nearly wiped out. This was the final concerted action by Japanese planes, airforce or navy, except for the desperate and scattered kamakaze attacks. After this, the Kido Butai ceased to be a significant force .. although that was a fact unknown to the USA's Admiral Halsey during the Battle of Leyte Gulf.
- Canadian Arctic explorer Henry Larsen reached Vancouver after sailing from Halifax, Nova Scotia through the Northwest Passage in just 86 days.
- Born:
  - Renzo Imbeni, Italian Communist politician, Mayor of Bologna, in Bologna. (d. 2005)
  - Angela Rippon, British television presenter in Plymouth, England
- Died: Alfredo Di Dio, 24, Italian Catholic partisan, commander of the Brigate Fiamme Verdi (Green Flames Brigades), fallen in the combat for the defense of the Ossola Republic; Andrew Haldane, 27, U.S. Marine (killed during the Battle of Peleliu); Jack J. Pendleton, 26, U.S. Army soldier and recipient of the Medal of Honor (killed in action at Bardebnerg, Germany)

== October 13, 1944 (Friday) ==
- Allied forces liberated Athens from German occupation.
- The Germans launched V-1 and V-2 flying bombs at Antwerp in an attempt to deny use of its crucial port to the Allies.
- The Battle of Rovaniemi in Finland ended in German retreat.
- Assault on Hoogerheide by the 1st Battalion of The Black Watch of Canada in the Netherlands ends in disaster. This event has come to be known as Black Friday by the Black Watch.

== October 14, 1944 (Saturday) ==
- German forces withdrew from Niš.
- In Italy, the American Fifth Army had some success on the Apennine front; a South African division entered Grizzana, and the German Army left Livergnano. In Romagna, the Polish II Corps went into action.
- The German and Fascist troops reconquered Domodossola, which for forty days had been the capital of an independent republic, ruled by the partisans and the antifascist parties.
- The Canadian frigate Magog was torpedoed and damaged in the Gulf of Saint Lawrence by German submarine U-1223 and rendered a constructive total loss.
- "I'll Walk Alone" by Dinah Shore hit #1 on the Billboard singles charts.
- Born: Udo Kier, actor, in Cologne, Germany (d. 2025)
- Died: Erwin Rommel, 52, German field marshal (allowed to commit suicide by the Nazis rather than face trial and reprisals against his family for his knowledge of the July Bomb Plot)

== October 15, 1944 (Sunday) ==
- The ceasefire between Hungary and the Soviet Union was publicized. Regent of Hungary Miklós Horthy made a radio broadcast announcing that he had made a separate peace with the Soviet Union withdrawing Hungary from the war. Germans respond immediately with Operation Panzerfaust.
- During the Riga Offensive, the Soviet 3rd Baltic Front captured Riga itself.
- Anti-Nazi partisan fighters launched the Kosovo Operation to expel German forces from Kosovo.
- In Italy, the Polish II Corp frees Gambettola.
- The German cruiser Leipzig collided with the cruiser Prinz Eugen during a heavy fog in the Baltic Sea and was declared a constructive total loss.
- German submarine U-777 was sunk off Wilhelmshaven during a British air raid.
- Born: Haim Saban, media proprietor and producer, in Alexandria, Kingdom of Egypt; David Trimble, politician, in Bangor, County Down, Northern Ireland (d. 2022)

== October 16, 1944 (Monday) ==
- Soviet forces began the Gumbinnen Operation, attempting to penetrate the borders of East Prussia. This means that the borders of the pre war reich would be open
- Operation Rimau ended in failure for Z Special Unit.
- Regent of Hungary Miklós Horthy was forced out of office and replaced by Ferenc Szálasi of the fascist Arrow Cross Party.
- With the Gothic Line now penetrated, the U.S. Fifth Army launched a new offensive toward Bologna with the objective of taking the city before the onset of winter. In Romagna, the 10. Indian Division is the first allied unit to pass the Savio River.
- Albanian partisans liberated Vlorë.
- American bombing of Salzburg destroys the dome of the city's cathedral and most of a Mozart family home.
- Born: Elizabeth Loftus, American cognitive psychologist and memory specialist, in Los Angeles

== October 17, 1944 (Tuesday) ==
- The Battle of Leyte began when American forces and Filipino guerrillas under the command of General Douglas MacArthur launched an amphibious invasion of the Gulf of Leyte in the Philippines.
- Rival partisans in Athens began fighting each other.
- Contact was lost with the USS Escolar. The American submarine was probably lost to a mine in the Yellow Sea.
- Died: Pavel Haas, 45, Czech composer (murdered at Auschwitz concentration camp); Hans Krása, 44, Czech composer (murdered at Auschwitz)

== October 18, 1944 (Wednesday) ==
- The exiled Greek government returned to Athens.
- Germany announced the formation of the Volkssturm, a national militia.
- The British Eighth Army in Italy captured Galeata.
- Erwin Rommel was given a state funeral in Ulm. German military personnel and Nazi officials who attended included Friedrich Ruge, Karl Strölin, Konstantin von Neurath and Wilhelm Ritter von Leeb.
- Died: Viktor Ullmann, 46, Silesia-born Austrian composer (murdered at Auschwitz concentration camp)

== October 19, 1944 (Thursday) ==
- The U.S. Seventh Army captured Bruyères.
- The Fourth Moscow Conference ended.
- German submarine U-957 collided with a German merchant ship at Lofoten, Norway and was withdrawn from service two days later as a result of the damage sustained.
- The Cuba-Florida Hurricane made landfall at Sarasota, Florida and moved north. A total of 300 people were killed in the storm.
- Born: Peter Tosh, reggae musician, in Grange Hill, Jamaica (d. 1987)
- Died: Dénes Kőnig, 60, Hungarian-Jewish mathematician (suicide)

== October 20, 1944 (Friday) ==
- The Philippines Campaign began. Douglas MacArthur made a speech from a portable radio set at Leyte that began: "This is the Voice of Freedom, General MacArthur speaking. People of the Philippines: I have returned."
- The Belgrade Offensive ended in Partisan/Soviet victory when the capture of Belgrade itself was completed.
- Operation Pheasant began - an offensive in the Netherlands which supported the ongoing Battle of the Scheldt
- Guatemalan President Juan Federico Ponce Vaides was overthrown by a popular uprising. The ten-year period of Guatemalan history known as the Guatemalan Revolution began.
- The Cleveland East Ohio Gas explosion killed 130 people and destroyed a one-mile square area of the east side of Cleveland, Ohio.
- Born: Clive Hornby, actor, in Liverpool, England (d. 2008)

== October 21, 1944 (Saturday) ==
- The Battle of Aachen ended in American victory when the last German garrison in Aachen surrendered.
- Axis forces established the Syrmian Front, a line of defense on the Eastern Front northwest of Belgrade.
- Red Army soldiers carried out the Nemmersdorf massacre in East Prussia.
- Despite heavy rain, U.S. President Franklin D. Roosevelt rode in an open car through 51 miles (82 km) of New York City streets on his way to make a speech at Ebbets Field in Brooklyn. With a little over two weeks left to go in the presidential election campaign, Roosevelt's ride through the city in the pouring rain without any proper covering was an attempt to show that he was still healthy.

== October 22, 1944 (Sunday) ==
- The main offensive in the Battle of Memel ended in Soviet victory.
- The Soviet 14th Army reached the Norwegian border.
- The Battle of Angaur ended in American victory.
- Canadian Private Ernest Smith earned the Victoria Cross for his actions over the night of October 21–22 on the Savio in Italy. Smith disabled a German tank and then killed four panzergrenadiers and damaged another tank while protecting a wounded comrade.
- Died: Richard Bennett, 74, American actor

== October 23, 1944 (Monday) ==
- The Battle of Leyte Gulf began between U.S./Australian and Japanese forces at Leyte Gulf in the Philippines, possibly the largest naval battle in history. The Japanese cruisers Atago and Maya were sunk off Palawan by the American submarines Darter and Dace, respectively.
- German submarine U-985 struck a mine off Lista, Norway and was withdrawn from service.
- The Allies recognized the Provisional Government of the French Republic as the legitimate government of France.
- Died: Charles Glover Barkla, 67, British physicist and Nobel laureate

== October 24, 1944 (Tuesday) ==
- The Riga Offensive ended in Soviet victory.
- The Daksa executions took place on October 24/25 when Yugoslav Partisans killed 53 men accused of collaborationism.
- In the Battle of Leyte Gulf, the American aircraft carrier USS Princeton was crippled by a kamikaze aircraft attack and was scuttled. Japanese destroyer Wakaba was bombed and sunk by American aircraft from USS Franklin.
- The Japanese battleship Musashi was bombed and sunk in the Sibuyan Sea by U.S. aircraft.
- The American submarine Shark was depth charged and sunk in the Luzon Strait by Japanese warships.
- The American submarine Darter ran aground in the Palawan Strait and was scuttled to prevent capture by the Japanese.
- The Japanese hell ship Arisan Maru was torpedoed and sunk in the South China Sea by an American submarine. Only nine of the 1,781 Allied and civilian prisoners of war survived.
- Martial law was lifted in Hawaii and habeas corpus restored.
- Died: Shōji Nishimura, 54, Japanese admiral (killed in action in the Surigao Strait)

== October 25, 1944 (Wednesday) ==
- The most intense fighting of the Battle of Leyte Gulf was waged, including the Battle off Samar in the centermost action. The Japanese lost the aircraft carriers Chitose, Chiyoda and Zuikaku, battleships Fusō and Yamashiro, cruisers Chikuma, Chōkai and Suzuya and the destroyers Akizuki, Asagumo, Michishio, Wakaba and Yamagumo. The Americans lost the escort carriers Gambier Bay and St. Lo and destroyers Hoel and Johnston. The St. Lo was the first of 47 ships to be sunk by kamikaze attacks during the war.
- Petsamo–Kirkenes Offensive: the 14th Army of the Soviet Karelian Front captured the Norwegian town of Kirkenes.
- The American submarine Tang was sunk by one of her own torpedoes near Formosa.
- The Allies officially recognized the Italian government under Ivanoe Bonomi.
- Florence Foster Jenkins, the amateur operatic soprano known for her lack of singing ability, made her first proper public appearance at a sold-out Carnegie Hall.
- Born: Kati Kovács, singer, and actress, in Verpelét, Hungary

== October 26, 1944 (Thursday) ==
- The Battle of Leyte Gulf ended in decisive Allied victory. On the final day of the battle the Japanese lost the cruisers Abukuma, Kinu and Noshiro, destroyers Hayashimo, Nowaki and Uranami and submarine I-26
- Died: Princess Beatrice of the United Kingdom, 87, youngest child of Queen Victoria; Hiroyoshi Nishizawa, 24, Japanese flying ace (shot down over Mindoro, Philippines in a transport plane in which he was riding as a passenger); William Temple, 63, Archbishop of Canterbury

== October 27, 1944 (Friday) ==
- The Gumbinnen Operation ended in Soviet failure due to strong resistance by the Wehrmacht.
- The Japanese destroyers Fujinami and Shiranui were sunk north of Iloilo, Panay by U.S. aircraft.
- German submarine U-1060 was damaged in the North Sea by British aircraft and was grounded and wrecked near Brønnøysund.
- German forces captured Banská Bystrica, the center of anti-Nazi opposition in Slovakia, bringing the Slovak National Uprising to an end.
- Died: Walter Reed Weaver, 59, American major general

== October 28, 1944 (Saturday) ==
- Japanese submarine I-45 torpedoed and sank the American destroyer escort USS Eversole (DE-404) in Leyte Gulf.
- Bulgaria signed an armistice with the Western Allies.
- The Battle of the Dukla Pass ended indecisively.
- The Slovak National Uprising was put down by Axis forces.
- Charles de Gaulle ordered the French Resistance to disarm.
- A V-1 flying bomb killed 71 people in Antwerp.
- Born: Dennis Franz, actor, in Chicago, Illinois
- Died: Kurt Gerron, 47, German actor, film director (murdered at Auschwitz concentration camp)

== October 29, 1944 (Sunday) ==
- Soviet and Romanian forces began the Budapest Offensive.
- The Petsamo–Kirkenes Offensive ended in Soviet victory.
- The Battle of Debrecen ended inconclusively.
- RAF Bomber Command carried out Operation Obviate aimed at sinking the German battleship Tirpitz at Tromsø. The attack was foiled by cloud cover and the bombs caused only minor damage.
- Reichsführer SS Heinrich Himmler orders the closure of gas chambers at Auschwitz and other extermination camps
- The Finnish People's Democratic League was founded.
- National Broadcasting Company broadcasts the first Jewish religious service from occupied Germany from Aachen, Germany
- Born: Denny Laine (born Brian Frederick Hines), musician (The Moody Blues, Wings), in Tyseley, Birmingham, England (d. 2023)

== October 30, 1944 (Monday) ==
- The British Eighth Army reached Forlì. The Allied advance in Italy had slowed considerably in recent days and time was running out to realize the objective of taking Bologna before winter.
- The U.S. Third Army completed the capture of Maizières-lès-Metz.
- Finnish forces captured Muonio in northern Finland.
- The Greek government banned the leftist militia group ELAS.
- Born: Ahmed Chalabi, politician, in Kadhimiya, Iraq (d. 2015)

== October 31, 1944 (Tuesday) ==
- 25 British Mosquito planes carried out the successful Aarhus Air Raid targeting the Gestapo headquarters at Aarhus University in Denmark.
- The last German forces evacuated Salonika ahead of the arrival of a force of the British Special Boat Service. German vessels in the port were also scuttled, removing the last Kriegsmarine presence in the Aegean Sea.
- French serial killer Marcel Petiot was apprehended at a Paris Métro station when he was recognized despite having grown a beard.
- Died: Henrietta Crosman, 83, American stage and film actress; Russell Foskett, 27, Australian aviator and flying ace (plane crash in the Aegean Sea)
