= Mathias Rust =

German activist, landed a plane near Red Square in Moscow in 1987

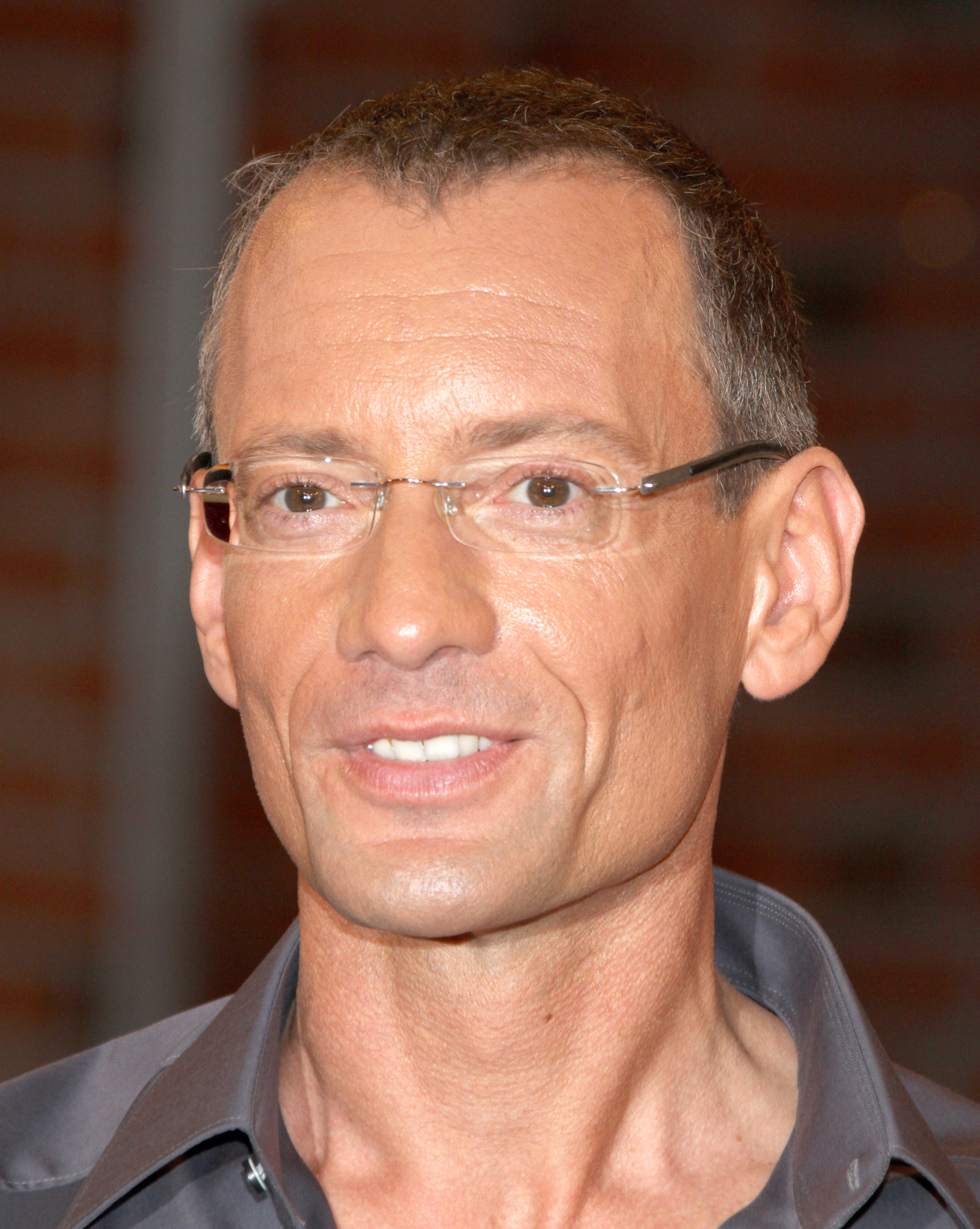
- Rust in 2012
- Born: 1 June 1968 (age 58); Wedel, Schleswig-Holstein, West Germany
- Known for: Illegally landing a small aircraft on Moscow's Red Square

Mathias Rust (born 1 June 1968) is a German aviator. In 1987, as a teenage amateur pilot, he flew from Helsinki, Finland, to Moscow, without authorization. According to Russian claims, he was tracked several times by Soviet Air Defence Forces and civilian air traffic controllers, as well as Soviet Air Force interceptor aircraft. The Soviet fighters did not receive permission to shoot him down, and his aeroplane was mistaken for a friendly aircraft several times. Also, 28 May 1987 was Border Guards Day, leaving many guards distracted. He landed on Bolshoy Moskvoretsky Bridge, next to Red Square near the Kremlin in the capital of the USSR.

Rust said he wanted to create an "imaginary bridge" to the East, and that his flight was intended to reduce tension and suspicion between the two sides of the Cold War. Rust was sentenced to four years in a general-regime labour camp for violation of border crossing and air traffic regulations, and for provoking an emergency situation upon his landing. After 14 months in prison, he was pardoned by Andrei Gromyko, the Chairman of the Presidium of the Supreme Soviet, and released.

Rust's flight through a supposedly impenetrable air defence system had a great effect on the Soviet military and resulted in the dismissal of many senior officers, including Minister of Defence Marshal of the USSR Sergei Sokolov and the Commander-in-Chief of the Soviet Air Defence Forces, former World War II fighter pilot ace Chief Marshal Alexander Koldunov. The incident aided Mikhail Gorbachev in the implementation of his reforms, by allowing him to dismiss numerous military officials opposed to his policies.

== Moscow flight ==
Flight path.

Rust, aged 18, was an inexperienced pilot, with about 50 hours of flying experience at the time of his flight. On 13 May 1987, Rust left Uetersen Airport, near Hamburg and his home town Wedel, in his rented Reims Cessna F172P, registration D-ECJB, which was modified by removing some of the seats and replacing them with auxiliary fuel tanks. He spent the next two weeks travelling across northern Europe, visiting the Faroe Islands, spending a week in Iceland, and then visiting Bergen on his way back. He later said that he had the idea of attempting to reach Moscow even before the departure, and he considered the journey to Iceland (where he visited Höfði, the site of unsuccessful talks between the U.S. and Soviet governments during October 1986) as a method of testing his piloting skills.

On 28 May 1987, Rust refuelled at Helsinki-Malmi Airport. He told air traffic control that he was going to Stockholm, and took off at 12:21. Immediately after his final communication with traffic control, he turned his plane to the east near Nummela, Vihti. Air traffic controllers tried to contact him as he was moving around the busy Helsinki–Moscow route, but Rust had turned off all his communications equipment.

Rust disappeared from the Finnish air traffic radar near Espoo. Control personnel presumed an emergency and a rescue effort was organized, including a Finnish Border Guard patrol boat. They found an oil patch near Sipoo where Rust had disappeared from radar observation, and conducted an underwater search but did not find anything.

Rust crossed the Baltic coastline over Estonia and turned towards Moscow. At 14:29 he appeared on Soviet Air Defence Forces (PVO) radar and, after failure to reply to an Identification Friend or Foe (IFF) signal, was assigned combat number 8255. Three surface-to-air missile battalions of 54th Air Defence Corps tracked him for some time, but failed to obtain permission to launch missiles at him. All air defences were readied and two interceptors were sent to investigate. At 14:48, near Gdov, MiG-23 pilot Senior Lieutenant A. Puchnin observed a white sport airplane similar to a Yakovlev Yak-12 and asked for permission to engage, but was denied.

The fighters lost contact with Rust soon after this. While they were being directed back to him, he disappeared from radar near Staraya Russa. West German magazine Bunte speculated that he might have landed there for some time, noting that he changed his clothes during his flight and that he took too much time to fly to Moscow considering his airplane's speed and the weather conditions.

Air defence re-established contact with Rust's plane several times but confusion resulted from all of these events. The PVO system had shortly before been divided into several districts, which simplified management but created additional work for tracking officers at the districts' borders. The local air regiment near Pskov was on maneuvers and, due to inexperienced pilots' tendency to forget correct IFF designator settings, local control officers assigned all traffic in the area friendly status, including Rust.

Near Torzhok, there was a similar situation, as increased air traffic was created by a search and rescue operation. Rust, flying a slow propeller-driven aircraft, was confused with one of the helicopters participating with the operation. He was detected several more times and given false friendly recognition twice. Rust was considered as a domestic training airplane defying regulations, and was assigned the least priority by air defense.

Around 19:00, Rust appeared above Moscow. He had initially intended to land in the Kremlin, but he reasoned that landing inside, hidden by the Kremlin walls, would have allowed the KGB to arrest him and deny the incident. Therefore, he changed his landing place to Red Square. Dense pedestrian traffic did not allow him to land there either, so after circling about the square one more time, he was able to land on Bolshoy Moskvoretsky Bridge by St. Basil's Cathedral. A later inquiry found that trolleybus wires normally strung over the bridge—which would have prevented his landing there—had been removed for maintenance that morning, and were replaced the next day. After taxiing past the cathedral, he stopped about 100 metres (330 ft) from the square, where he was greeted by curious passersby and asked for autographs. When asked where he was from, he replied "Germany" making the bystanders think he was from East Germany; but when he said West Germany, they were surprised. A British doctor videotaped Rust circling over Red Square and landing on the bridge. Rust was arrested two hours later.

== Aftermath ==
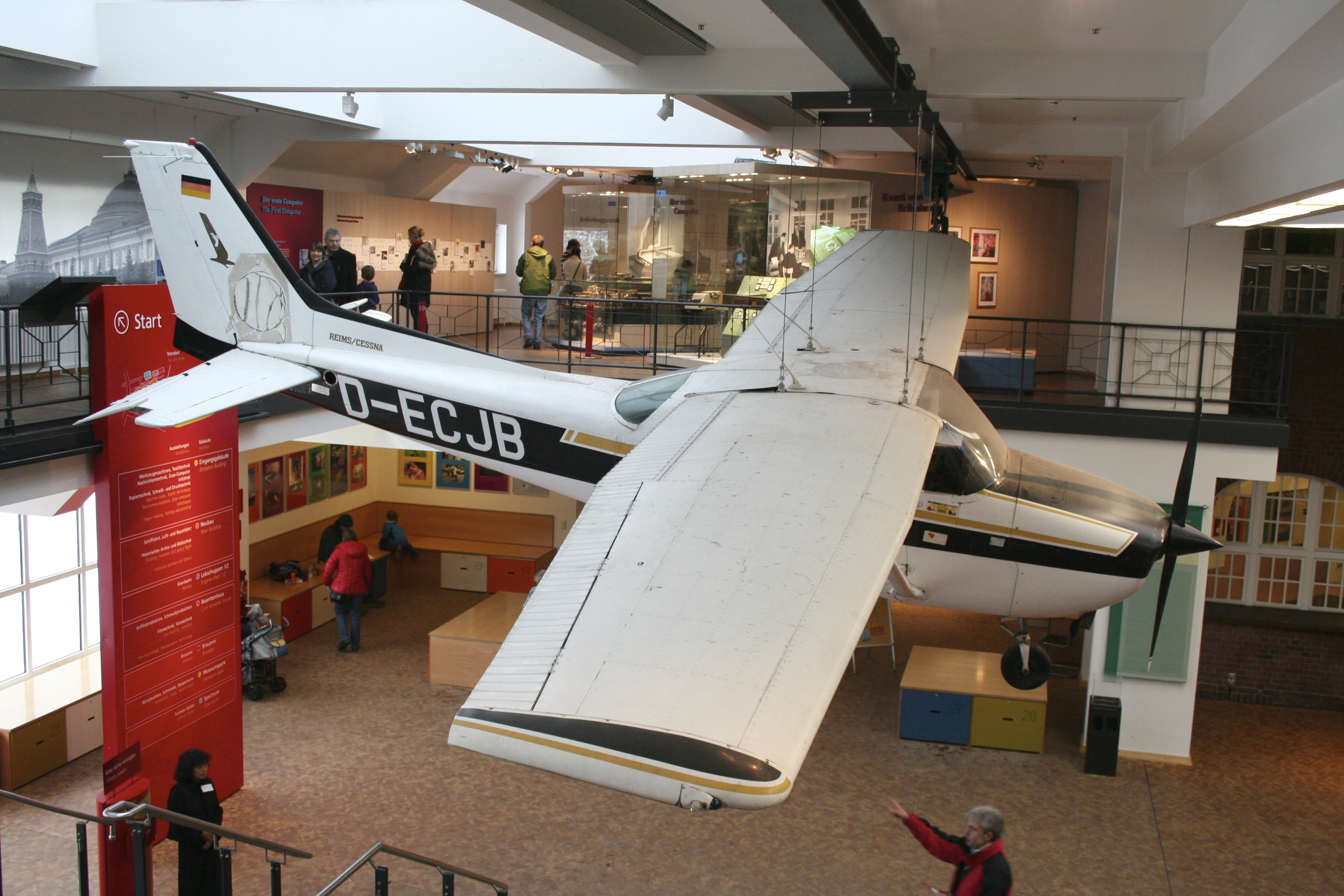
D-ECJB at the German Museum of Technology in Berlin (2010).

Rust's trial began in Moscow on 2 September 1987. He was sentenced to four years in a general-regime labour camp for hooliganism, for disregard of aviation laws, and for breaching the Soviet border. He was never transferred to a labour camp, and instead served his time at the high security Lefortovo temporary detention facility in Moscow. Two months later, Reagan and Gorbachev agreed to sign a treaty to eliminate intermediate-range nuclear weapons in Europe, and the Supreme Soviet ordered Rust to be released in August 1988 as a goodwill gesture to the West.

Rust's return to Germany on 3 August 1988 was accompanied by huge media attention, but he did not talk to the journalists assembled; his family had sold the exclusive rights to the story to the German magazine Stern for 100,000 DM. He reported that he had been treated well in the Soviet prison. Journalists described him as "psychologically unstable and unworldly in a dangerous manner".

William E. Odom, former director of the U.S. National Security Agency and author of The Collapse of the Soviet Military, says that Rust's flight irreparably damaged the reputation of the Soviet military. This enabled Gorbachev to remove many of the strongest opponents to his reforms. Minister of Defence Sergei Sokolov and the commander of the Soviet Air Defence Forces Alexander Koldunov were dismissed along with hundreds of other officers. This was the biggest turnover in the Soviet military since Stalin's purges 50 years earlier.

Rust's rented Reims Cessna F172P (serial #F17202087), registered D-ECJB, was sold to Japan where it was exhibited for several years. In 2008 it was returned to Germany and was placed in the German Museum of Technology in Berlin.

Because Rust's flight seemed harmful to the authority of the Soviet regime, it was the source of numerous jokes and legends. For a while after the incident, Red Square was referred to jokingly by some Muscovites as Sheremetyevo-3 (Sheremetyevo-1 and -2 being the two terminals at Moscow's international airport). At the end of 1987, the police radio code used by law enforcement officers in Moscow was allegedly updated to include a code for an aircraft landing.

At Saka Manor Park in Estonia, there is a monument dedicated to Rust's flight.

== Later life ==
On 24 November 1989, while doing his obligatory community service (Zivildienst) as an orderly in a West German hospital, Rust stabbed a female co-worker who had "apparently rejected him". He was sentenced to two and a half years in prison, but was released after 15 months. Since then, he has lived a fragmented life, describing himself as a "bit of an oddball". After being released from court, he converted to Hinduism in 1996 to become engaged to a daughter of an Indian tea merchant. In 2001, he was convicted of stealing a cashmere pullover and ordered to pay a fine of 10,000 DM, which was later reduced to 600 DM. Another legal incident occurred during 2005, when he was convicted of fraud and had to pay a €1,500 fine. In 2009, Rust described himself as a professional poker player. Most recently, in 2012, he described himself as an analyst for a Zürich-based investment bank, dividing his time between Hamburg, Switzerland and Asia, and is training to be a yoga teacher. He said he had plans to open a yoga school in Hamburg.

=== Peace activism ===
In October 2015, The Hindu published an interview with Rust to commemorate the 25th anniversary of German reunification. Rust opined that institutional failures in Western countries to preserve moral standards and democratic ideals were creating mistrust between peoples and governments. Referring to the genesis of a New Cold War between Russia and the Western powers, Rust suggested that India should be cautious and avoid entanglement: "India will be better served if it follows a policy of neutrality while interacting with EU member countries as the big European powers at present are following the foreign policy of the U.S. unquestioningly". He claimed: "Governments have been dominated by the corporate entities and citizens have ceased to matter in public policy".

== In the media ==
In 2007, for the 20th anniversary of his flight, Rust was interviewed by different media outlets about the flight and its aftermath. The Washington Post and Bild both have online editions of their interviews. The most comprehensive televised interview available online is produced by the Danish Broadcasting Corporation. In their interview Rust in Red Square, recorded in May 2007, Rust gives a full account of the flight in English.

== See also ==
- 1960 U-2 incident
- Korean Air Lines Flight 007
