= September 1944 =

Month of 1944

<<	September 1944					>>
Su	Mo	Tu	We	Th	Fr	Sa
					1	2
3	4	5	6	7	8	9
10	11	12	13	14	15	16
17	18	19	20	21	22	23
24	25	26	27	28	29	30

The following events occurred in September 1944:

== September 1, 1944 (Friday) ==
- The Battle of Lone Tree Hill ended in American victory.
- Soviet forces took Călărași and reached the Bulgarian frontier at Giurgiu. Moscow requested permission for their troops to enter Bulgarian territory.
- The First Canadian Army captured Dieppe, the site of the failed 1942 commando raid, and pressed on along the northern French coast.
- German submarine U-247 was depth charged and sunk in the English Channel by Canadian warships.
- The Frank Capra-directed dark comedy film Arsenic and Old Lace starring Cary Grant premiered at the Strand Theatre in New York City.
- Born: Leonard Slatkin, conductor and composer, in Los Angeles, California

== September 2, 1944 (Saturday) ==
- Konstantin Muraviev became Prime Minister of Bulgaria.
- The First Canadian Army took Saint-Valery-en-Caux and reached the River Somme.
- Finland severed diplomatic relations with Germany and ordered all Germans to leave the country.
- German submarine U-394 was sunk southeast of Jan Mayen by a Fairey Swordfish of 825 Squadron, Fleet Air Arm and gunfire from British warships.
- Lipniak-Majorat massacre: German troops carried out a massacre of around 450 Poles, including many women and children, in the village of Lipniak-Majorat in occupied Poland.
- The Spanish-language family magazine ¡Hola! was founded in Barcelona.
- Born: Gilles Marchal, singer and songwriter, in Paris, France (d. 2013)
- Died George W. Norris, American politician (b. 1861)

== September 3, 1944 (Sunday) ==
- Finland and the Soviet Union agreed on a ceasefire to take effect at 8:00 a.m. the next morning.
- The British Second Army captured Brussels while the U.S. First Army took Tournai.
- Gerd von Rundstedt was restored as Oberbefehlshaber West, replacing Walter Model.
- The Germans began Operation Birke to protect access to nickel in Finnish Lapland.
- Prime Minister Muraviev halted the execution of political prisoners in Bulgaria.
- 15 year old Anne Frank is sent on a transport to Auschwitz-Birkenau together with her father, mother and sister, and the four other people who were in hiding with them. It is the last transport from Holland to the death camps "in the East" including Auschwitz.
- Born: Ty Warner, toy manufacturer, businessman and actor, in Oak Brook, Illinois
- Died: Emil Lang, 35, German flying ace (plane crash during an aerial battle near Overhespen, Belgium)

== September 4, 1944 (Monday) ==
- Soviet troops in Romania captured Brașov and Sinaia.
- The Battle of Gemmano began in Italy as part of the Allied assault on the Gothic Line.
- The British Guards Armoured Division took Kortenberg and Leuven.
- The U.S. Seventh Army took Bourg-en-Bresse.

== September 5, 1944 (Tuesday) ==
- The Soviet Union declared war on Bulgaria, which never attacked the USSR but was aligned with the Axis.
- The Battle of Turda began in Romania.
- Štefan Tiso replaced Vojtech Tuka as Prime Minister of the Slovak Republic.
- The Cornwall–Massena earthquake along the Saint Lawrence rift system in North America did $2 million damage.
- Sweden said it would bar entry to Nazis attempting to flee.
- German submarine U-362 was depth charged and sunk in the Kara Sea by Soviet minesweeper T-116.
- Died: Gustave Biéler, 40, French spy (executed by a Nazi firing squad)

== September 6, 1944 (Wednesday) ==
- The Tartu Offensive ended in Soviet victory.
- The French 2nd Corps captured Chalon-sur-Saône.
- Polish forces liberate Ypres in Belgium from occupying German forces.
- All four carrier groups of Task Force 38 began air strikes on Japanese positions in the Palau Islands.
- The British government relaxed blackout restrictions and suspended compulsory training for the Home Guard.
- Born: Christian Boltanski, artist, in Paris France (d. 2021); Swoosie Kurtz, American Actress
- Died: Jan Franciszek Czartoryski, 47, Polish noble, military chaplain and one of the 108 Blessed Polish Martyrs of World War II (shot by the Germans during the Warsaw Uprising); Ted T. Tanouye, 24, Japanese American soldier and posthumous recipient of the Medal of Honor (died in Italy of wounds sustained from an exploding land mine five days earlier)

== September 7, 1944 (Thursday) ==
- Hungary declared war on Romania and crossed into southern Transylvania.
- Members of Vichy France's collaborationist government were relocated to Germany where an enclave was established for them in Sigmaringen Castle.
- Shin'yō Maru incident: The Japanese cargo ship SS Shin'yō Maru was torpedoed and sunk in the Sulu Sea by American submarine USS Paddle while carrying 750 American prisoners of war aboard. 688 perished.
- Born: Earl Manigault, street basketball player, in Charleston, South Carolina (d. 1998); Bora Milutinović, footballer and manager, in Bajina Bašta, Yugoslavia; Sam Sloan, American perennial candidate and former broker-dealer.

== September 8, 1944 (Friday) ==
- On the Eastern Front, the Battle of the Dukla Pass began for the Dukla Pass at the border of Poland and Slovakia.
- The Belgian government in exile led by Hubert Pierlot returned to Brussels from London.
- Bulgaria accepted an armistice with the Soviet Union.
- The first V-2 flying bomb to reach British soil (launched from The Hague) landed in Chiswick, west London, demolishing eleven houses and killing three people immediately. The British government did not acknowledge the new German weapon until November.
- The Italian ocean liner SS Rex was sunk at Trieste by an air raid of Bristol Beaufighters from No. 272 Squadron RAF.

== September 9, 1944 (Saturday) ==
- A coup d'état in Bulgaria overthrew the government of Konstantin Muraviev after one week in power and replaced it with a government of the Fatherland Front led by Kimon Georgiev.
- German submarine U-484 was depth charged and sunk northwest of Ireland by British warships.
- U-865 was lost sometime after this date to unknown causes after leaving Trondheim, Norway.
- Miss District of Columbia Venus Ramey was crowned Miss America 1944.
- Died: Robert Benoist, 59, French racing driver and member of the French Resistance (executed at Buchenwald)

== September 10, 1944 (Sunday) ==
- RAF Bomber Command began Operation Paravane, another attack on the German battleship Tirpitz anchored in northern Norway.
- The U.S. 3rd Armored Division occupied St. Vith and reached the German border.
- Liberation of Luxembourg.
- German submarines U-20 and U-23 were scuttled in the Black Sea to prevent capture by the advancing Soviets.

== September 11, 1944 (Monday) ==
- Elements of the First Canadian Army reached the Belgian coastal village of Zeebrugge.
- Communist leader Bolesław Bierut assumed the presidency of a new provisional government of Poland.
- German submarine U-19 was scuttled in the Black Sea.
- US troops crossed the border into Nazi Germany for the first time. At 16:30 hours, a 7-person patrol led by Sgt. Warner W. Holzinger of the 2nd Platoon, Troop B, 85th Cavalry Reconnaissance Squadron, 5th Armored Division, crossed the river Our at Stolzembourg, Luxembourg and reached Keppeshausen. They studied the pillbox area, and returned safely to Stolzembourg at 18:50 having encountered no German military personnel. This was also the first advance through enemy lines in Germany.

== September 12, 1944 (Tuesday) ==
- The Second Quebec Conference began in Quebec City, Canada.
- Romania signed an armistice with the Allies in Moscow. Romania agreed to provide twelve divisions to fight Germany, provide goods and raw materials to the USSR, ban all fascist organizations, repeal anti-Jewish laws and revert to their 1940 borders. The Soviet Union took control of Bessarabia and northern Bukovina.
- About 12,000 German troops surrendered as the First Canadian Army captured Le Havre.
- In the Apennine Mountains, the U.S. Fifth Army joined in the assault on the Gothic Line.
- The Japanese passenger ship Rakuyō Maru was sunk in the South China Sea by American submarine USS Sealion while transporting 1,317 Australian and British prisoners of war. A total of 1,159 POWs died.
- Japanese destroyer Shikinami was sunk south of Hong Kong by the American submarine Growler.
- Born: Leonard Peltier, Native American activist and convicted murderer, in Grand Forks, North Dakota; Barry White, composer, singer and songwriter, in Galveston, Texas (d. 2003)

== September 13, 1944 (Wednesday) ==
- The Battle of Rimini began in Italy.
- The 47th Army of the 2nd Belorussian Front took the Warsaw suburb of Praga.
- Soviet aircraft began dropping supplies to the Home Army in Warsaw overnight.
- The American destroyer USS Warrington sank off the Bahamas in the Great Atlantic hurricane.
- The Battle of Meligalas between the Greek People's Liberation Army and the Security Battalions begins in Greece.
- Born: Carol Barnes, television newsreader and broadcaster, in Norwich, England (d. 2008); Jacqueline Bisset, actress, in Weybridge, Surrey, England; Peter Cetera, singer, songwriter, bassist and original member of rock band Chicago, in Chicago, Illinois
- Died: Yolande Beekman, 32, Madeleine Damerment, 26, Eliane Plewman, 26 and Noor Inayat Khan, 30, SOE agents (executed at Dachau concentration camp); W. Heath Robinson, 72, English cartoonist and illustrator

== September 14, 1944 (Thursday) ==
- The Soviets began the Baltic Offensive and the Riga Offensive.
- Operation Dragoon ended in Allied victory.
- The Battle of Păuliș began in Romania between Hungarian and Soviet/Romanian forces.
- Canadian and British troops pushing through the Gothic Line captured Coriano.
- The National Oceanic and Atmospheric Administration recorded the third highest water level of Woods Hole, MA to date at 1.488 meters.
- Died: John Kenneth Macalister, 30, Frank Pickersgill, 29, and Roméo Sabourin, 21, Canadian spies (executed at Buchenwald)

== September 15, 1944 (Friday) ==
- The Lapland War begins between Germany and Finland.
- The Germans carried out Operation Tanne Ost to capture the Finnish island of Suursaari before it could fall into Soviet hands. The operation was a complete failure for the Germans with the Finns taking 1,231 prisoners.
- German frogmen carried out a successful raid on the floodgates at Antwerp and rendered the port unusable to the Allies for six weeks.
- The Battle of Gemmano in Italy ended in Allied victory.
- The Battle of Peleliu began between U.S. and Japanese forces on the island of Peleliu.
- The Battle of Morotai between Allied and Japanese forces began in the Maluku Islands.
- The French provisional government in Paris said it would try Vichy war criminals and issued warrants for the arrests of Philippe Pétain and his cabinet.
- The Great Atlantic Hurricane made landfall on Long Island and Rhode Island.
- The Battle of Meligalas between the Greek People's Liberation Army and the Security Battalions ends, and is followed by a massacre of the captive Security Battalionists.

== September 16, 1944 (Saturday) ==
- The Soviet 3rd Ukrainian Front occupied the Bulgarian capital of Sofia.
- The Second Quebec Conference ended.
- In accordance with a call from the Danish National Council in London (not actually a government in exile but an association of free Danes), workers in Denmark went on strike starting at noon to protest the transfer of about 190 Danish political prisoners to Germany. The strike mostly affected the transportation system.
- Hitler made the decision to go through with the Ardennes Offensive in his Prussian headquarters (the Wolf's Lair). This would become the Battle of the Bulge.
- Died: Gustav Bauer, 74, Chancellor of Germany from 1919 to 1920

== September 17, 1944 (Sunday) ==
- Operation Market Garden began when Allied paratroopers landed in the Netherlands and XXX Corps advanced from Belgium. The Battle of Arnhem began in the Netherlands.
- The 3rd Canadian Division began Operation Wellhit to take the fortified town of Boulogne in northern France.
- 30,000 Dutch rail workers obeyed a call from General Eisenhower to go on strike to paralyze the German transport system in Holland. Many of the workers went into hiding.
- Operation Paravane ended when a bomb hit the German battleship Tirpitz, disabling her and causing the Germans to tow her south to Tromsø where she would be sunk in Operation Catechism two months later.
- The Battle of San Marino began during the Italian Campaign.
- The Soviets began the Tallinn Offensive.
- The Battle of Angaur began between U.S. and Japanese forces in the island of Angaur in the Palau Islands.
- The Japanese escort carrier Un'yō was torpedoed and sunk in the South China Sea by the American submarine Barb.
- Blackout restrictions were relaxed in London.
- Born: Reinhold Messner, mountaineer and adventurer, in Brixen, Italy

== September 18, 1944 (Monday) ==
- Eindhoven liberated by 101st Airborne Division.
- The Battle of Arracourt began near the French town of Arracourt.
- The Japanese hell ship Jun'yō Maru was sunk off Sumatra by the British submarine Tradewind with the loss of 5,620 lives, the worst maritime disaster in history up to that time.
- American B-17 bombers dropped 1,284 containers of supplies to the Home Army in Warsaw, but only 228 fell on Polish-controlled territory. This was the only major supply drop of the war that the Soviets allowed the western Allies to carry out.
- Born: Veronica Carlson, model and actress, in Yorkshire, England (d. 2022); Satan's Angel, exotic dancer, née Angel Cecilia Helene Walker in San Francisco, California (d. 2019)
- Died: Robert G. Cole, 29, American soldier and recipient of the Medal of Honor (killed in action by a sniper during Operation Market Garden); Viktor Eberhard Gräbner, 30, German Waffen-SS officer and recipient of the Knight's Cross of the Iron Cross (killed during the Battle of Arnhem)

== September 19, 1944 (Tuesday) ==
- The Continuation War between Finland and the Soviet Union came to an end with the signing of the Moscow Armistice.
- The Battle for Brest ended in Allied victory.
- The Battle of Păuliș ended in Romanian-Soviet victory.
- The Battle of Hürtgen Forest began between German and U.S. forces in the Hürtgen Forest along the border of Belgium and Germany.
- Thomas E. Dewey made a nationally broadcast campaign speech in Portland, Oregon in which he said that the making of peace was too important "to be dependent upon the life span and continued friendship of two or three individuals." Dewey said that there were "no indispensable men."
- SS and Police Leader of Denmark Günther Pancke proclaimed a state of emergency and ordered the Danish police disarmed in an effort to stop the Danish transportation strike from becoming a general strike. This measure brought about shooting in front of the castle in Copenhagen when the royal guards thought they would be disarmed as well, and eight people were killed. Striking would continue for two more days.
- German submarine U-407 was depth charged and sunk in the Mediterranean Sea off Milos, Greece by Allied warships.
- U-565 was severely damaged by American aircraft near Skaramagas, Greece and scuttled five days later.
- U-867 was depth charged and sunk west of Bergen by a B-24 of No. 224 Squadron RAF.
- Born: İsmet Özel, poet and scholar, in Kayseri, Turkey

== September 20, 1944 (Wednesday) ==
- Nijmegen liberated by 82nd Airborne Division and Guards Armoured Division after the Battle of Nijmegen.
- The Battle of San Marino ended in Allied victory.
- Soviet forces captured the island of Suur-Tytärsaari in the Gulf of Finland.
- The pirate film Frenchman's Creek starring Joan Fontaine and Arturo de Córdova was released.

== September 21, 1944 (Thursday) ==
- The Battle of Porkuni was fought between Estonians serving in the Red Army and Estonian pro-independence and Waffen-SS units. The battle resulted in Soviet victory.
- The Battle of Rimini ended in Allied victory.
- San Marino declared war on Germany.
- Japanese destroyer Satsuki was bombed and sunk in Manila Bay by American aircraft.
- The St. Louis Cardinals clinched their third straight National League pennant with a 5–4 win over the Boston Braves in the first game of a doubleheader.
- Born: Hamilton Jordan, White House Chief of Staff to President Jimmy Carter, in Charlotte, North Carolina (d. 2008)

== September 22, 1944 (Friday) ==
- Operation Wellhit ended in Allied victory when Boulogne fell to the 3rd Canadian Division. Operation Undergo now began with the objective of taking the French port of Calais.
- Units of the Red Army captured Tallinn.
- American troops captured the Il Giogo pass on the Gothic Line in Italy.
- Born: Frazer Hines, actor, in Horsforth, England; David Snyder, film and television production designer, in Buffalo, New York. With regards to notable works significantly, he is the assistant director of Blade Runner alongside director Ridley Scott.

== September 23, 1944 (Saturday) ==
- The Soviet Army crossed into Hungarian territory.
- An RAF bombing raid destroyed an aqueduct on the Dortmund-Ems Canal and brought a halt to the shipment of prefabricated U-boat parts via this route.
- German submarine U-859 was torpedoed and sunk in the Strait of Malacca by British submarine Trenchant.
- U.S. President Franklin D. Roosevelt made a campaign speech in Washington before the International Teamsters Brotherhood. He responded to a rumor that he'd sent a Navy destroyer to the Aleutian Islands to retrieve his Scottish Terrier Fala at great taxpayer expense by saying, "You know, Fala is Scotch, and being a Scottie, as soon as he learned that the Republican fiction writers in Congress and out had concocted a story that I had left him behind on the Aleutian Islands and had sent a destroyer back to find him— at a cost to the taxpayers of two or three, or eight or twenty million dollars- his Scotch soul was furious. He has not been the same dog since. I am accustomed to hearing malicious falsehoods about myself—such as that old, worm-eaten chestnut that I have represented myself as indispensable. But I think I have a right to resent, to object to libelous statements about my dog." Roosevelt drew huge laughs from the audience and the speech became a defining moment in the campaign.
- Died: Harry Chandler, 80, American newspaper publisher and real estate mogul

== September 24, 1944 (Sunday) ==
- British troops captured Deurne, Netherlands.
- Italy's high commissioner for the punishment of Fascist crimes Mario Berlinguer said that he would seek a court order to reopen the case of the 1924 murder of Socialist politician Giacomo Matteotti.
- German submarine U-596 was bombed and damaged in Salamis Bay by American aircraft and consequently scuttled.
- Born: Sepp Schönmetzler, figure skater and coach, in Etzdorf, Germany
- Died: Helen Hay Whitney, American socialite (b. 1876)

== September 25, 1944 (Monday) ==
- Operation Market Garden ended in defeat for the Allies when they failed to cross the Rhine. The operation was mostly overlooked in popular histories of World War II until the 1974 publication of the book A Bridge Too Far by Cornelius Ryan, which was the basis for a film of the same name released in 1977.
- The Soviet 8th Army captured the Baltic Sea port of Haapsalu.
- German submarine U-703 was lost somewhere off Norway and presumed foundered.
- Harvard Medical School announced that women would be accepted as students starting next fall.
- Born: Michael Douglas, actor and producer, in New Brunswick, New Jersey
- Died: Eugeniusz Lokajski, 34, Polish sportsman and photographer (killed by an artillery barrage during the Warsaw Uprising)

== September 26, 1944 (Tuesday) ==
- The Tallinn Offensive ended in Soviet victory.
- The Battle of Arnhem ends after the British evacuation with a German victory.
- The British Eighth Army in Italy crossed the Rubicon.
- In Caserta, the Greek government-in-exile concluded an agreement with resistance groups who acknowledged its authority.
- Born: Anne Robinson, television presenter and journalist, in Crosby, Lancashire, England

== September 27, 1944 (Wednesday) ==
- Soviet troops and Yugoslav Partisans crossed the border into Albania.
- The Battle of Metz began in France.
- Finnish forces captured Pudasjärvi in northern Finland.
- The Japanese troop transport and hospital ship Ural Maru was torpedoed and sunk in the South China Sea by the American submarine Flasher with the loss of some 2,000 lives.
- The British destroyer Rockingham (formerly the USS Swasey) struck a mine in the North Sea and sank under tow.
- Died: Aristide Maillol, 82, French sculptor, painter and printmaker; Aimee Semple McPherson, 53, American evangelist and media celebrity

== September 28, 1944 (Thursday) ==
- Soviet, Yugoslav Partisan and Bulgarian forces began the Belgrade Offensive.
- Winston Churchill made a speech in the House of Commons reviewing the progress of the war and announcing that a Jewish brigade would be formed to take part in active operations. "I know there is a vast number of Jews serving with our forces and the American forces throughout all the armies, but it seems to me indeed appropriate that a special Jewish unit of that race which has suffered indescribable torment from the Nazis should be represented as a distinct formation among the forces gathered for their final overthrow," Churchill explained. "I have no doubt that they will not only take part in the struggle but also in the occupation which will follow."
- A roundup in Bratislava orchestrated by Alois Brunner captures 1,800 Jews and puts an end to one of the most successful underground Jewish organizations during the Holocaust, the Bratislava Working Group. The Jews are deported to Auschwitz, where most are murdered.
- Died: Josef Bürckel, 49, German Nazi politician (apparent complications from exhaustion)

== September 29, 1944 (Friday) ==
- The Red Army began the Moonsund Landing Operation, an amphibious assault as part of the Baltic Offensive.
- The Battle of Arracourt ended in American victory.
- Born: Mike Post, television theme music composer, in Berkeley, California
- Died: John William Harper, 28, British soldier awarded the Victoria Cross for his self-sacrifice during a battle in Antwerp; Otto Herfurth, 51, German Generalmajor (hanged for his involvement in the 20 July bomb plot); Virginia Tonelli, 40, Italian partisan executed by burning (posthumously awarded the Gold Medal of Military Valour)

== September 30, 1944 (Saturday) ==
- The secondary stage of the Lublin–Brest Offensive concluded with Soviet objectives met.
- The besieged German garrison at Calais surrendered to Canadian forces.
- The American destroyer escort USS Fessenden (DE-142) depth charged and sank German submarine U-1062 southwest of the Cape Verde Islands.
- The Germans commenced a counter offensive to retake the Nijmegen salient, which had been taken by the Allies in Operation Market Garden.
- Born: Jimmy Johnstone, footballer, in Viewpark, Uddingston, Scotland (d. 2006)
- Died: Bud Jamison, 50, American film actor
