= Niš incident =

Aerial confrontation between the United States and the Soviet Union in 1944

The Niš incident was a friendly fire incident during World War II involving American and Soviet forces. On 7 November 1944, United States Army Air Forces fighters strafed a Red Army convoy and airbase near Niš, Yugoslavia, which resulted in an air battle over the area between American and responding Soviet Air Force fighters. More than thirty Red Army soldiers were killed on the ground. Two American P-38 Lightning and two Soviet Yak-9 fighters were shot down in the air battle, and a third Yak-9 fell to Soviet antiaircraft fire.

Due to the death of Red Army general Grigory Kotov, the incident caused diplomatic strain, which was resolved when Soviet officials accepted the American explanation that the attack was a mistake caused by navigational error. Despite the official Soviet conclusion, postwar memoirs claimed that the American attack was intentional.

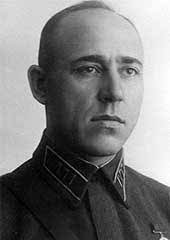
Soviet general Grigory Kotov

== Background ==
After the liberation of Bulgaria, Soviet forces from the 3rd Ukrainian Front advanced into southern Yugoslavia in the Belgrade offensive and in cooperation with the Yugoslav Partisans liberated Belgrade. After taking part in the liberation of Bulgaria with the 37th Army, Lieutenant General Grigory Kotov's 6th Guards Rifle Corps was transferred to the 3rd Ukrainian Front's 57th Army, preparing to attack into southern Hungary. In the first week of November, the corps marched into Yugoslavia en route to the positions of the 57th Army. At the same time, German troops were retreating from Greece into Yugoslavia and Hungary. Тhe 3rd Ukrainian Front and Yugoslav partisan troops sought to block their retreat, which the Western Allies interdicted with aircraft based in Italy.

== Incident ==
On 7 November, the 82nd Fighter Group of the Fifteenth Air Force was assigned to launch strikes against German motorized columns and trains moving between Sjenica and Mitrovica. Commanded by Colonel Clarence T. "Curly" Edwinson, the strike included the Lockheed P-38 Lightnings of the 95th, 96th, and 97th Fighter Squadrons. At the beginning of the strike the 95th Fighter Squadron claimed a German locomotive destroyed in a strafing attack, and Captain Charles King's P-38 was shot down by flak. King was rescued by local peasants near Sjenica and saved by Chetniks. Continuing eastward, the three squadrons of the 82nd spotted the vehicle column from the 6th Guards Rifle Corps moving from Niš towards Belgrade, and attacked at about 10:00 a.m., from southeast over Mount Jastrebac, some 80 km (50 miles) into Soviet held territory. The first squadron immediately started to strafe the leading vehicles, destroying several, with 31 killed and 37 wounded. The commander of the corps, Lieutenant General Grigory Petrovich Kotov, was also killed in this attack.

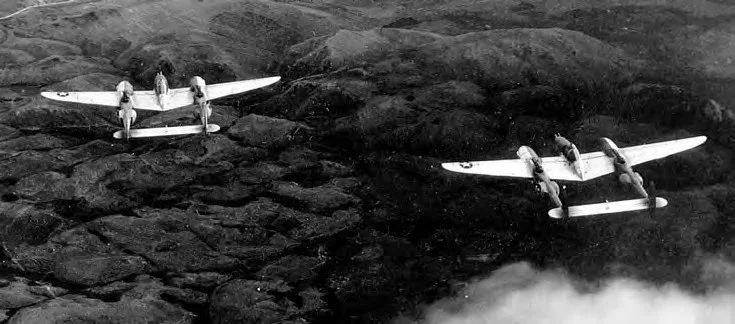
Two P-38 Lightnings of the 82nd Fighter Group descending for a strafing attack

While the second group of American P-38s were starting their attack, the commander of the 17th Air Army, General Vladimir Sudets, who was at the Niš airbase at the time, issued an order for immediate takeoff to the pilots on duty flying Yakovlev Yak-9 fighters from 866th Fighter Aviation Regiment of 288th Fighter Aviation Division based at Niš, believing they were being attacked by German Focke-Wulf Fw 189.

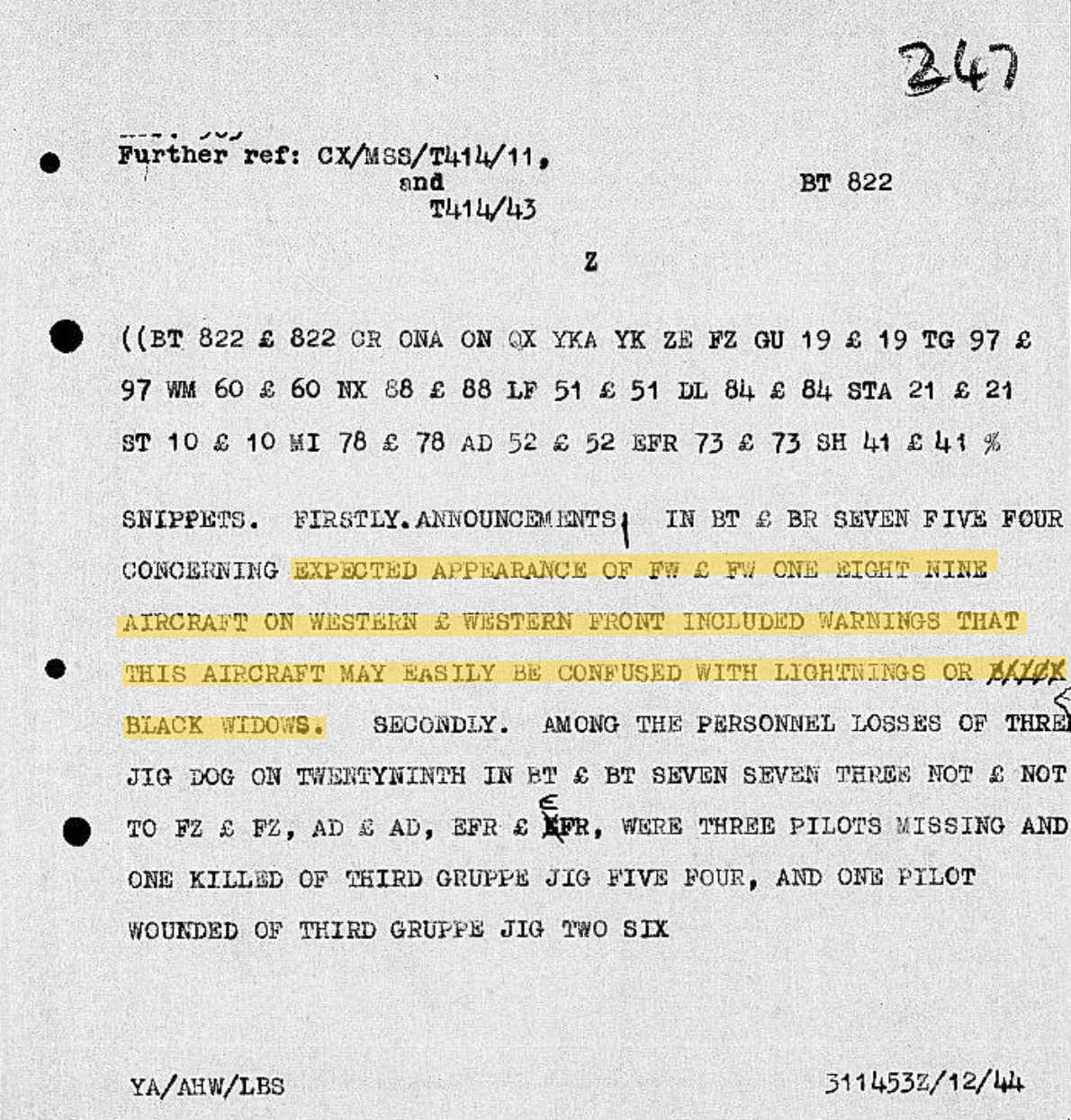
Similarities between Fw 189 and American P-38 & P-61 aircraft highlighted in Enigma traffic decrypted by ULTRA

The Fw 189 was a reconnaissance also used for tactical ground attacks which bore similarities with the American P-38 Lightning, a fact even highlighted by German Enigma communications. The American planes shifted their fire to the Soviet fighters which were taking off in spite of clearly visible large red star markings on their wings. One of the Yak-9s was immediately destroyed.

The P-38s then climbed to about 500 metres (1,600 ft) and formed a defensive circle above the city of Niš itself, waiting to see how this uncertain situation would be resolved.

Soon the battle was joined by a second group of Yaks led by Soviet fighter ace Captain Aleksandr Koldunov, who took off from another airbase near Niš. The 'tangle of death' that formed in the air moved westward across the city with the sound of machine gun and cannon fire. Nine Soviet Yak-3 and an unidentified number of US P-38 fighters participated in the battle, which lasted for about another 15 minutes.

The report of the 866th IAP, the first Soviet account of the air battle, began by describing the incident as follows:

On 7 November 1944, at 12:50 [Moscow time] a group of 12 Lightning aircraft carried out a ground attack on units of the rifle corps of the 3rd Ukrainian Front, moving west along the road from Niš in the area of Čamurlija. Four aircraft in formation on an extended bearing carried out an attack, one at a time...Two [four-plane] flights of Lightnings flew in formation on an extended bearing...After the first attack anti-aircraft fire opened up on the aircraft from the air defenses of the Niš airfield, anti-aircraft fire shot down one Lightning, which fell 1 kilometer north of the airfield. At 13:00 the Yak-9 pair on duty of the 866th IAP took off by sight, leader Lieutenant Krivonogikh and wingman Junior Lieutenant Shipulya. At 13:05 six Yak-9s took off, leader squadron commander Captain Bondar, flight commanders Senior Lieutenants Surnev, Zheleznov, and Potsiba, pilots Lieutenant Zhestovsky and Junior Lieutenant Serdyuk. At 13:10 a Yak-3 pair took off, leader Captain Koldunov and wingman Lieutenant Krasyukov. The first pair, taking off, approached the four attacking Lightnings with a turn to the right. Two Lightnings attacked Krivonogikh's pair. Jr. Lt. Shipulya attacked a Lightning, which was beginning a repeated attack on the ground forces. It caught fire on the first pass and crashed into the ground at an angle of 40 degrees in the area 500 meters north of the Niš airfield, where it burned. Lt. Krivonogikh, repelling the attacks of two Lightnings, set one of them on fire with a vertical maneuver, which fell burning 8 to 10 kilometers north of Niš, on the mountain in a forest tract.

The 288th Fighter Aviation Division report diverged from the initial report of the 866th IAP, stating that Koldunov personally ended the air battle when he approached the lead P-38 at close range and waggled his wings to show the red star on his aircraft, describing an attack by "up to 18 Lightnings" rather than the original twelve. The embellishment of Koldunov's role was repeated by the air army report and then by Aleksey Antonov when he summarized the incident for John R. Deane. The combat journal of the 288th Fighter Aviation Division reported ten Yak-9s scrambled to cover the Niš airfield, with two shot down by the Americans. One pilot was killed and the other sent to the hospital, suffering serious burns bailing out of his aircraft. A third aircraft, pursuing a P-38, was shot down by Soviet antiaircraft fire and pilot killed. All downed aircraft crashed in the area of Niš. The division suffered losses on the ground when the 611th Fighter Aviation Regiment, relocating by vehicle from the Niš to Kruševac, was strafed by Lightnings, killing a mechanic and seriously wounding another. The 17th Air Army combat journal reported the air battle as taking place between 12:40 and 13:30 (Moscow time) and involved eight Yak-9s and eighteen Lightnings. The journal reported that the Soviet pilots entered battle in "self defense, attempting to inform the American aircraft of their error." The 866th Fighter Aviation Regiment claimed to have downed three P-38s and damaged three more. In fact, two P-38s were downed with both pilots killed. For their part, the Americans also claimed to have shot down four Soviet aircraft. Soviet troops reached the crash sites and confirmed that the dead pilots were American by their documents and the airframes.

At the same time as the 866th IAP's pilots took off, between 12:50 and 13:20 (Moscow time), four Yak-9T of the 897th IAP, also based at Niš airfield, took off to cover the air base. Approaching the American aircraft, they waggled their wings and avoided engaging them.

== Reactions ==
Edwinson did not report the incident to his superiors and instead went on leave. Three days later, on 10 November, Red Army deputy chief of the General Staff General Aleksey Antonov reported the incident to Major General John R. Deane, chief of the American military mission in Moscow. In his report, Antonov increased the number of attacking Lightnings to 27. Edwinson was reassigned stateside after an investigation.

The United States apologized to the Soviet Union, stating that the attack was the result of a grave error by American pilots sent to attack German forces on the road from Skopje to Pristina. On 14 December, American ambassador to the Soviet Union W. Averell Harriman apologized on behalf of Franklin D. Roosevelt and George C. Marshall and offered to send liaison officers to the 3rd Ukrainian Front to prevent further incidents; Stalin rejected it, because a line of demarcation had been drawn indicating the boundaries of Allied air actions.

== Legacy ==
In the Soviet Union, the incident was kept secret during the war, potentially to deny Nazi Germany any propaganda value from the incident. Memoirs of Soviet officers published in the 1960s during the Khrushchev Thaw were the first public discussion of the incident within the country, although none of the Soviet pilots who were direct participants published memoirs. These accounts, from the peak of the Cold War, repeated a distinctly hostile interpretation of the American actions. Because the incident happened on 7 November, October Revolution Day, claims arose that the incident was a deliberate American attack. 37th Army commander Sergey Biryuzov first mentioned the incident in literature in 1963, when he described the death of Kotov. In his memoirs, Biryuzov quoted Koldunov and Syrtsov as describing the air battle as an unprovoked attack by "two groups of American aircraft," one circling over Niš and the second dive-bombing Soviet troops. The pilots stated that the American aircraft "blockaded" the airfield and continued to shoot despite multiple Soviet approaches trying to display their red stars. Biryuzov described the action as a "provocative allied aviation raid," and recalled that an American liaison officer apologized to him, but that this "insincere step" could not "revive those who perished, just as destroyed cities could not be restored." Biryuzov's chief of staff, Arefa Blazhey, mentioned the incident in his memoirs, published four years later, describing the incident as a "treacherous strike from around the corner." Ground attack pilot Nikolay Shmelyov, who was a deputy squadron commander in the Niš-based 707th Assault Aviation Regiment during the incident, provided the first eyewitness account in his 1966 memoirs, repeating the claim of two separate American attacks. Shmelyov included numerous embellishments, including a fanciful account of Kotov dying in the arms of his son, and described the incident as "a piratical, treacherous raid by the "allies"".

After the thaw ended there was less public discussion until after the Glasnost era, when 288th Fighter Aviation Division commander Boris Smirnov published his memoirs, in which he recalled investigating the incident and repeated the earlier claims that the American fighters initiated the air battle. Smirnov wrote that he found a map on a dead American pilot that designated Niš as a target, implying that the attack was deliberate.

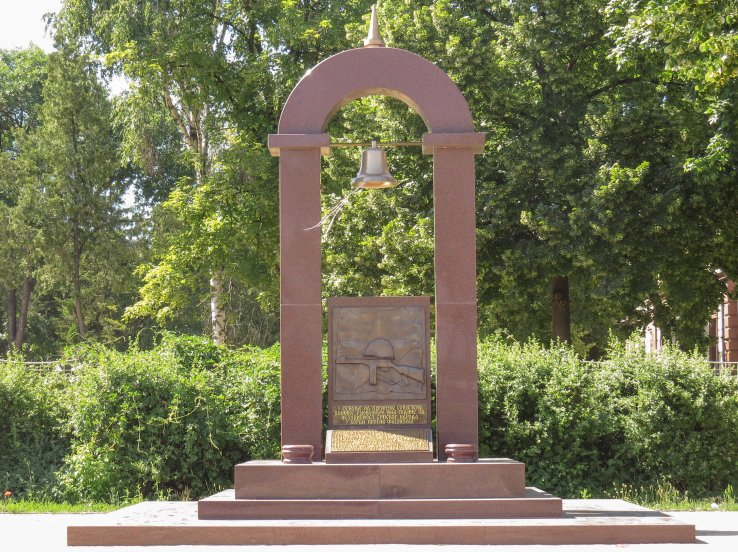
2015 monument to the soldiers killed in the incident

Beginning in the 2010s, the Russian government sponsored efforts to memorialize the incident, describing it as an American attack. A Russian-designed monument commemorating the Soviet soldiers killed in the incident was unveiled in Niš in 2015, the impetus for which came from the Russian embassy in Belgrade, Serbian government and the Russian-Serbian Humanitarian Center. The monument was presented by its promoters as a symbol of Russian-Serbian cooperation. A second monument was unveiled for Victory Day 2022 after the Russian invasion of Ukraine, in a ceremony attended by the Russian ambassador and Serbian interior minister Aleksandar Vulin. The Russian ambassador described the monument as a preservation of the "memory of the heroes and the combined struggle against Nazism," "taking into account the present events in Europe." A year later, a mural was unveiled at the monument depicting American aircraft attacking Soviet troops.

== See also ==
- Belgrade Offensive
