= Russian-Serbian Humanitarian Center =

Humanitarian response, aid, training of firefighters-rescuers in Niš, Serbia

- Российско-Сербский гуманитарный центр
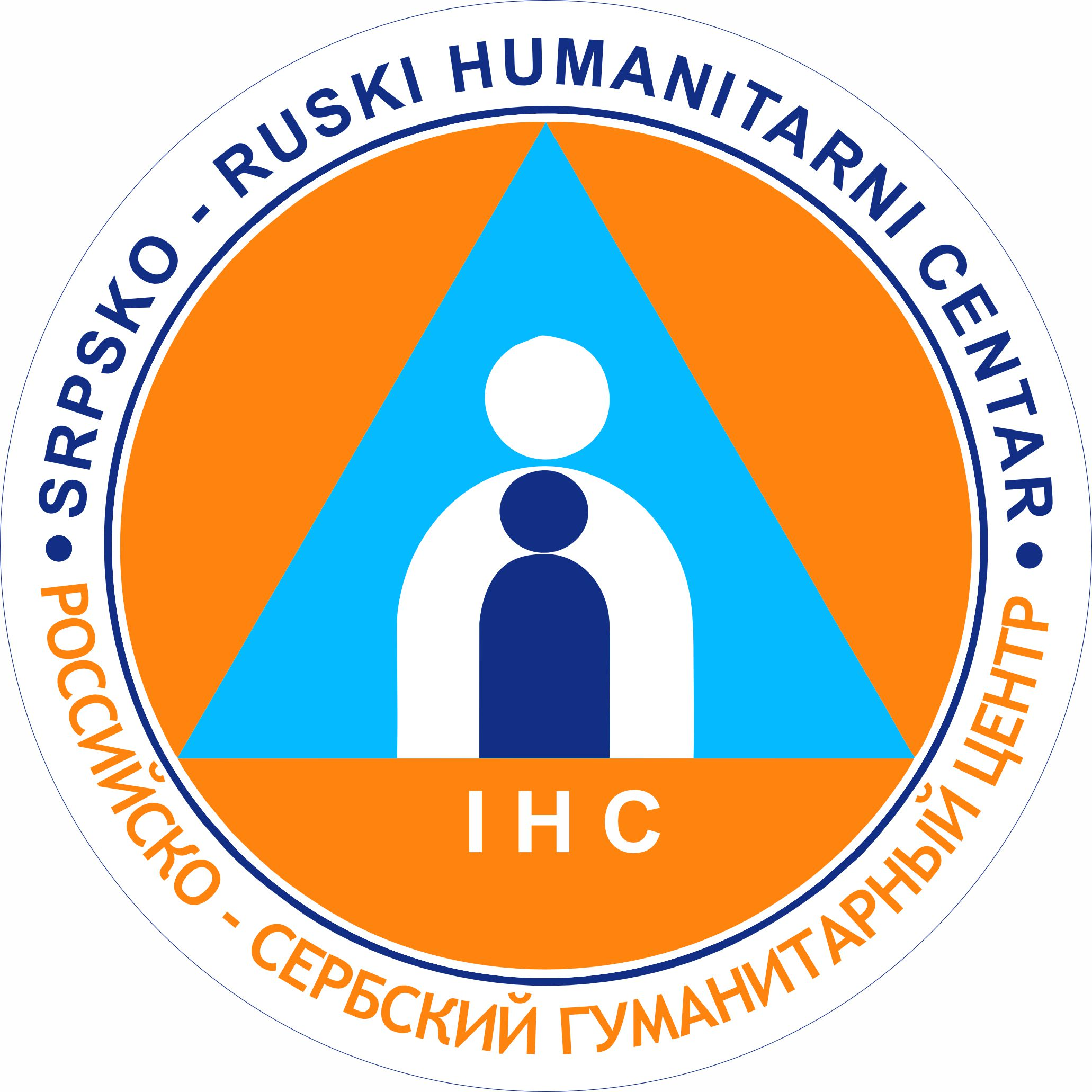
- Formation: 25 April 2012; 14 years ago
- Type: Governmental, Nonprofit
- Headquarters: Niš, Serbia
- Location: Vazduhoplovaca 1, Niš, Serbia
- Coordinates: 43°20′36″N 21°52′02.6″E
- Region served: Balkan
- Official language: Russian, Serbian
- Website: ihc.rs/en//

The Russian-Serbian Humanitarian Center (Serbian: Руско-српски хуманитарни центар, romanized: Rusko-srpski humanitarni centar; Russian: Российско-сербский гуманитарный центр; abbr. RSHC) is an intergovernmental nonprofit organization with the headquarters in Niš, Serbia. It is located near the Niš Constantine the Great Airport.

The Center is operating in Serbia and neighboring countries. It is an affiliated member and regional logistic and training center of the International Civil Defence Organization (ICDO).

RSHC established to provide number of humanitarian tasks on the territory of Serbia and Balkan region.

== History ==
=== Formation ===
The Russian-Serbian Humanitarian Center was established on 25 April 2012, following the signing of the Cooperation Agreement between the Government of the Russian Federation and the Government of the Republic of Serbia, on the initiative by Sergey Shoygu. The signatories of the Agreement are: Ivica Dačić, at the time Deputy Prime Minister of Serbia and the Minister of Internal Affairs of Serbia, Vladimir Puchkov, at the time Deputy Minister of Emergency Situations of Russia.

The legal basis for the establishment of the Center is the Agreement between the Governments of the Russian Federation and the Republic of Serbia on Cooperation in the Field of Emergency Humanitarian Response, Disaster Prevention, and the Mitigation of the Consequences of Natural Disasters and Technological Accidents, signed on October 20, 2009.

The Russian-Serbian Humanitarian Center is an intergovernmental, non-profit humanitarian organization with legal entity status. The Center is registered in the Republic of Serbia in accordance with its national legislation.

The Center is open to accession by any state or organization that shares its goals and objectives.

The Center is managed by a Director and a Co-Director, who are appointed by the Russian and Serbian sides respectively, on a rotating basis for a term of two years.
