= USS Flounder =

Submarine of the United States

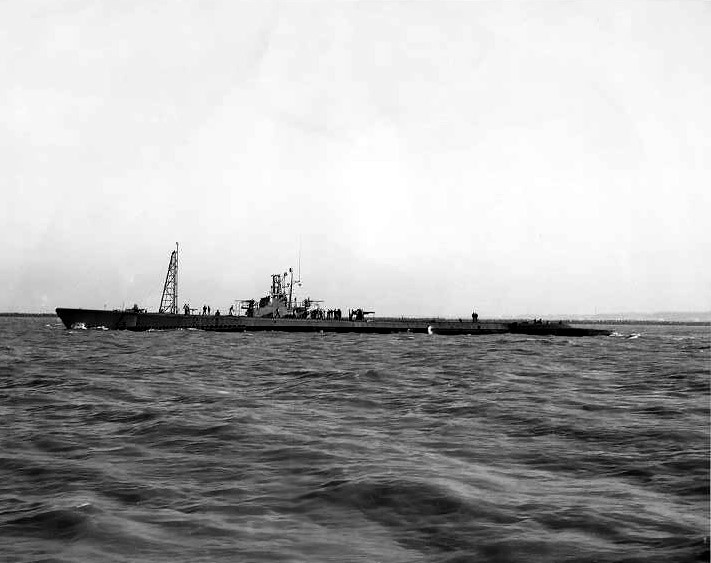

History

United States
- Builder: Electric Boat Company, Groton, Connecticut
- Laid down: 5 December 1942
- Launched: 22 August 1943
- Sponsored by: Mrs. Astrid H. McClellan
- Commissioned: 29 November 1943
- Decommissioned: 12 February 1947
- Stricken: 1 June 1959
- Fate: Scrapped February 1960

General characteristics
- Class & type: Gato-class diesel-electric submarine
- Displacement: 1,525 long tons (1,549 t); 2,424 long tons (2,463 t) submerged
- Length: 311 ft 9 in (95.02 m)
- Beam: 27 ft 3 in (8.31 m)
- Draft: 17 ft 0 in (5.18 m) maximum
- Propulsion: 4 × General Motors Model 16-248 V16 Diesel engines driving electric generators; 2 × 126-cell Sargo batteries; 4 × high-speed General Electric electric motors with reduction gears; two propellers; 5,400 shp (4.0 MW) surfaced; 2,740 shp (2.0 MW) submerged
- Speed: 21 kn (39 km/h) surfaced; 9 kn (17 km/h) submerged
- Range: 11,000 nmi (20,000 km) surfaced at 10 kn (19 km/h)
- Endurance: 48 hours at 2 kn (4 km/h) submerged; 75 days on patrol
- Test depth: 300 ft (90 m)
- Complement: 6 officers, 54 enlisted
- Armament: 10 × 21-inch (533 mm) torpedo tubes; 6 forward, 4 aft; 24 torpedoes; 1 × 3-inch (76 mm) / 50 caliber deck gun; Bofors 40 mm and Oerlikon 20 mm cannon

USS Flounder (SS-251), a Gato-class submarine, was the only ship of the United States Navy to be named for the flounder.

== Construction and commissioning ==
Flounder′s keel was laid down by the Electric Boat Company in Groton, Connecticut, on 5 December 1942. She was launched on 22 August 1943, sponsored by Mrs. Astrid H. McClellan, and commissioned on 29 November 1943.

== First and second war patrols ==
Flounder arrived at Milne Bay, New Guinea, from New London, Connecticut, on 6 March 1944, and 11 days later sailed on her first war patrol, bound for the Palau Islands. Many planes were sighted, limiting her action, and few contacts were made. She returned to Milne Bay to refit, then sailed to Manus for training, and from that base took departure 3 June on her second war patrol. In the Philippine Sea during the assault on the Mariana Islands, Flounder made a sound contact on 17 June which resulted in her sinking the 2,681-ton transport Nipponkai Maru. Escorts immediately began a persistent, vigorous, but ineffective counter-attack. On 24 June, as Flounder sailed on the surface, two enemy planes suddenly dived out of the cloud cover, and dropped bombs which landed close aboard, causing some minor damage. The submarine topped off her fuel tanks at Manus 6 July, and sailed on to Brisbane, Australia, to refit.

== Third, fourth and fifth war patrols ==
Flounder cleared Brisbane on her third war patrol 1 August 1944, and after calling at Manus on 8 and 9 August, sailed on to serve as lifeguard during strikes on the Philippine Islands. Once more, during the portion of her patrol devoted to aggressive patrol, she found few contacts, and was able to make only one attack. The intended target, a small escort, dodged her torpedoes, and drove her deep with depth charges. Flounder took on provisions and fuel at Mios Woendi, New Guinea, from 28 August to 1 September, then completed her patrol in Davao Gulf, returning to Brisbane on 4 October.

On her fourth war patrol, for which she sailed on 27 October 1944, Flounder patrolled the Java Sea with two other submarines, north of Lombok Strait on November 10. Flounder sighted what was first thought to be a small sailboat. Closer inspection revealed the target to be the conning tower of a submarine, and Flounder went to battle stations submerged. She sent four torpedoes away, observing one hit and feeling another as the target submarine exploded and was enveloped by smoke and flame. Coming back to periscope depth a half-hour later, Flounder found nothing in sight. She had sunk one of the German submarines operating in the Far East, U-537. U-537 was one of 10 German U-boats lost in Asian or East African waters during the war.

An attack by Flounder's group on a convoy off Palawan on 21 November 1944 sank the freighter Gyosan Maru (5,698 tons), but other contacts were few, and the sub returned to Fremantle to refit between 13 December and 7 January 1945. Underway for her fifth war patrol, Flounder had to return to Fremantle from 12 to 14 January to repair her fathometer, then sailed to lead a three-submarine coordinated attack group in the South China Sea. On 12 and 13 February, her group made a determined chase after a Japanese task force, but was unable to close these fast targets. A more obliging target came her way on 22 February, when she launched four torpedoes at a patrol boat. Two of these, however, ran erratically, and only Flounder's skillful maneuvering saved her from being hit by her own torpedoes. More trouble arrived three days later, when in a freak accident, she and USS Hoe (SS-258) brushed each other 66 feet (20 m) beneath the surface. Only a slight leak developed, which was quickly brought under control.

== Sixth war patrol, end of war and fate ==
Flounder prepared for her sixth war patrol at Subic Bay from 26 February 1945 to 16 March. Again with a wolfpack, she scouted targets south of Hainan, and on 29 March contacted a large convoy, which was attacked by aircraft before she and her sisters could launch their torpedoes. She closed her war patrol at Saipan on 22 April and headed home for a stateside overhaul. Returning to Pearl Harbor action-bound on the day hostilities ended, Flounder was ordered to the East Coast, and arrived at New York City on 18 September. After laying immobilized at Portsmouth, New Hampshire, and New London, Connecticut, she was decommissioned and placed in reserve at New London on 12 February 1947.

The second and fourth of Flounder's six war patrols were designated "Successful", and she is credited with having sunk 2,681 tons of Japanese shipping as well as U-537. Flounder received two battle stars for World War II service.
