= German submarine U-537 =

German World War II submarine

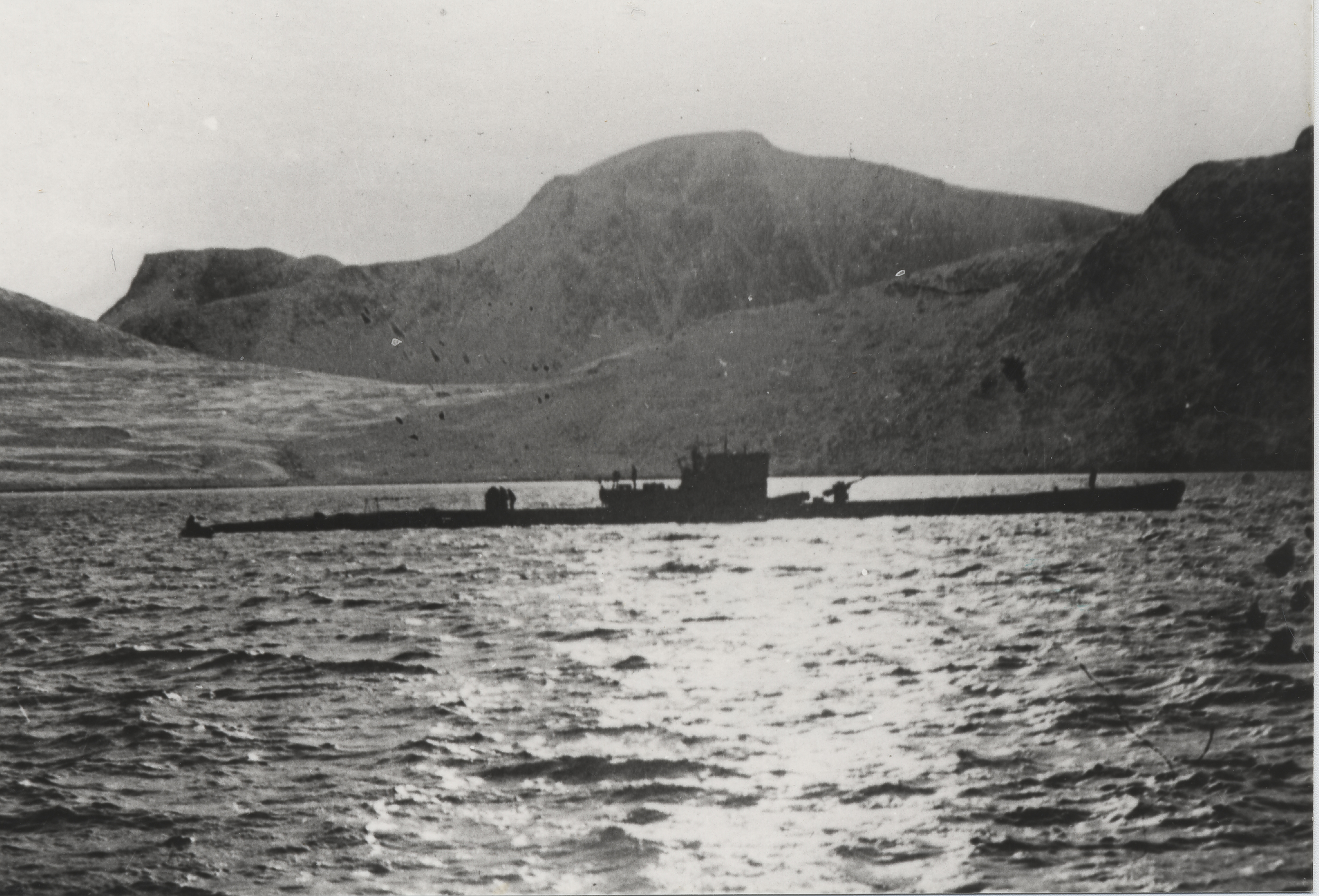
- U-537 in Martin Bay, Labrador

History

Nazi Germany
- Name: U-537
- Ordered: 10 April 1941
- Builder: Deutsche Werft AG, Hamburg-Finkenwerder
- Yard number: 355
- Laid down: 10 April 1942
- Launched: 7 November 1942
- Commissioned: 27 January 1943
- Fate: Sunk in the Java Sea on 10 November 1944

General characteristics
- Class & type: Type IXC/40 submarine
- Displacement: 1,144 t (1,126 long tons) surfaced; 1,257 t (1,237 long tons) submerged
- Length: 76.76 m (251 ft 10 in) o/a; 58.75 m (192 ft 9 in) pressure hull
- Beam: 6.86 m (22 ft 6 in) o/a; 4.44 m (14 ft 7 in) pressure hull
- Height: 9.60 m (31 ft 6 in)
- Draught: 4.67 m (15 ft 4 in)
- Installed power: 4,400 PS (3,200 kW; 4,300 bhp) (diesels); 1,000 PS (740 kW; 990 shp) (electric)
- Propulsion: 2 shafts; 2 × diesel engines; 2 × electric motors
- Speed: 18.3 knots (33.9 km/h; 21.1 mph) surfaced; 7.3 knots (13.5 km/h; 8.4 mph) submerged
- Range: 13,850 nmi (25,650 km; 15,940 mi) at 10 knots (19 km/h; 12 mph) surfaced; 63 nmi (117 km; 72 mi) at 4 knots (7.4 km/h; 4.6 mph) submerged
- Test depth: 230 m (750 ft)
- Complement: 4 officers, 44 enlisted
- Armament: 6 × torpedo tubes (4 bow, 2 stern); 22 × 53.3 cm (21 in) torpedoes; 1 × 10.5 cm (4.1 in) SK C/32 deck gun (180 rounds); 1 × 3.7 cm (1.5 in) SK C/30 AA gun; 1 × twin 2 cm FlaK 30 AA guns

Service record
- Part of: 4th U-boat Flotilla; 27 January – 31 July 1943; 10th U-boat Flotilla; 1 August 1943 – 30 September 1944; 33rd U-boat Flotilla; 1 October – 9 November 1944
- Identification codes: M 49 804
- Commanders: Kptlt. Peter Schrewe; 27 January 1943 – 9 November 1944
- Operations: 3 patrols: 1st patrol: a. 18 – 23 September 1943; b. 30 September – 8 December 1943; 2nd patrol: a. 25 March – 2 August 1944; b. 1 October 1944; 3rd patrol: 9 – 10 November 1944
- Victories: None

German submarine U-537 was a Type IXC/40 U-boat of Nazi Germany's Kriegsmarine during World War II. Her keel was laid down on 10 April 1942 by Deutsche Werft in Hamburg. She was commissioned on 27 January 1943 with Kapitänleutnant Peter Schrewe in command. Schrewe commanded the boat for nearly two years, until her loss.

U-537 conducted three patrols and holds the distinction of making the only armed German landing in North America during World War II, when her crew installed the automatic Weather Station Kurt in Martin Bay, Labrador on 22 October 1943. She was then sent to the Far East. On 10 November 1944 in the Java Sea east of Surabaya, U-537 was sunk with all hands—58 officers and men—by torpedoes from USS Flounder.

== Design ==
German Type IXC/40 submarines were slightly larger than the original Type IXCs. U-537 had a displacement of 1,144 tonnes (1,126 long tons) when at the surface and 1,257 tonnes (1,237 long tons) while submerged. The U-boat had a total length of 76.76 m (251 ft 10 in), a pressure hull length of 58.75 m (192 ft 9 in), a beam of 6.86 m (22 ft 6 in), a height of 9.60 m (31 ft 6 in), and a draught of 4.67 m (15 ft 4 in). The submarine was powered by two MAN M 9 V 40/46 supercharged four-stroke, nine-cylinder diesel engines producing a total of 4,400 metric horsepower (3,240 kW; 4,340 shp) for use while surfaced, two Siemens-Schuckert 2 GU 345/34 double-acting electric motors producing a total of 1,000 shaft horsepower (1,010 PS; 750 kW) for use while submerged. She had two shafts and two 1.92 m (6 ft) propellers. The boat was capable of operating at depths of up to 230 metres (750 ft).

The submarine had a maximum surface speed of 18.3 knots (33.9 km/h; 21.1 mph) and a maximum submerged speed of 7.3 knots (13.5 km/h; 8.4 mph). When submerged, the boat could operate for 63 nautical miles (117 km; 72 mi) at 4 knots (7.4 km/h; 4.6 mph); when surfaced, she could travel 13,850 nautical miles (25,650 km; 15,940 mi) at 10 knots (19 km/h; 12 mph). U-537 was fitted with six 53.3 cm (21 in) torpedo tubes (four fitted at the bow and two at the stern), 22 torpedoes, one 10.5 cm (4.13 in) SK C/32 naval gun, 180 rounds, and a 3.7 cm (1.5 in) SK C/30 as well as a 2 cm (0.79 in) C/30 anti-aircraft gun. The boat had a complement of forty-eight.

== Service history ==
=== First patrol ===
U-537 left Kiel on 18 September 1943 and sailed to Bergen, Norway, departing from there on her first patrol on 30 September. She sailed across the North Atlantic, and on 22 October she set up Wetter-Funkgerät Land-26 (code-named "Kurt") automatic weather station in Martin Bay, Labrador. The weather station was only discovered by accident by Canadian authorities in 1981.

While on anti-shipping patrol off Newfoundland on 31 October, the U-boat was attacked by a Canadian Hudson aircraft from No. 11 Squadron RCAF, which fired eight rockets, all missing. On 10 November a Canadian Catalina aircraft from No. 5 Squadron RCAF attacked her with four depth charges off Cape Race. The U-boat escaped unharmed, but the next day another Catalina of 5 Squadron attacked with four depth charges which slightly damaged the submarine. Surface ships then joined the hunt, but all failed to locate her, and U-537 arrived safely at Lorient on 8 December.

=== Second patrol ===
U-537 sailed from Lorient on 25 March 1944 and traveled around Africa, and then crossed the Indian Ocean to Batavia, which she reached on 2 August after a voyage of 131 days.

=== Third patrol ===
U-537 left Batavia for Surabaya in Indonesia on 1 October 1944, and began her third and final patrol on 9 November. On 10 November, she was spotted and sunk with all hands — 58 officers and men — in the Java Sea, at position 7°13′S 115°17′E, by torpedoes from USS Flounder in one of the few instances of an American submarine attacking a German vessel in World War II. U-537 was one of ten German U-boats lost in Asian or East African waters during the war.

== Bibliography ==
- Busch, Rainer; Röll, Hans-Joachim (1999). German U-boat commanders of World War II : a biographical dictionary. Translated by Brooks, Geoffrey. London, Annapolis, Md: Greenhill Books, Naval Institute Press. ISBN 1-55750-186-6.
- Busch, Rainer; Röll, Hans-Joachim (1999). Deutsche U-Boot-Verluste von September 1939 bis Mai 1945 [German U-boat losses from September 1939 to May 1945]. Der U-Boot-Krieg (in German). Vol. IV. Hamburg, Berlin, Bonn: Mittler. ISBN 3-8132-0514-2.
- Gröner, Erich; Jung, Dieter; Maass, Martin (1991). U-boats and Mine Warfare Vessels. German Warships 1815–1945. Vol. 2. Translated by Thomas, Keith; Magowan, Rachel. London: Conway Maritime Press. ISBN 0-85177-593-4.
