= List of German colonel generals =

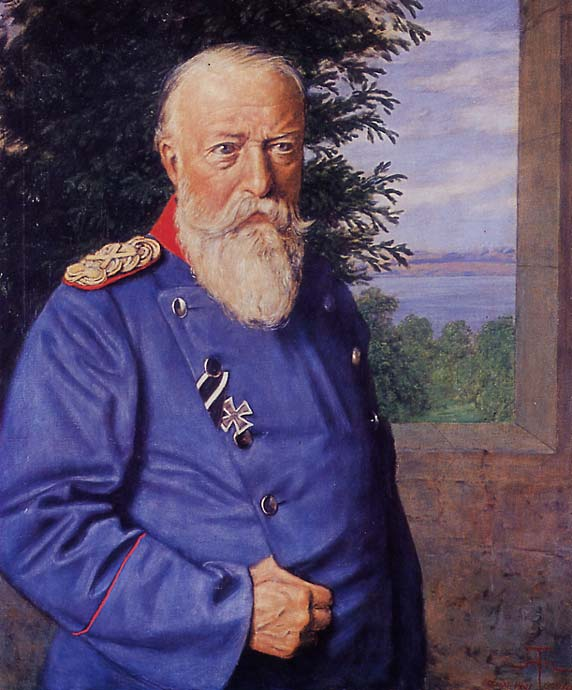
Frederick I, Grand Duke of Baden as Prussian colonel general (with the rank of Generalfeldmarschall (GFM)

The following is an incomplete list of German colonel generals.

Generals later promoted to general field marshal (GFM) are not included.

== German Empire ==
=== German Army ===
See also: ⇒ de: List of the German Empire's colonel generals

Insignias

Epaulette

Promoted	Name	Born	Died	Notes
1873	Prince August of Württemberg	1813	1885	Commander-in-Chief in the so-called Marken and Governor of Berlin
1888	Frederick I, Grand Duke of Baden	1826	1907	with the rank of a GFM, Inspector of the Army
1889	Charles Alexander, Grand Duke of Saxe-Weimar-Eisenach	1818	1901	à la suite of the Royal Saxon Army
1890	Prince of Bismarck, Duke of Lauenburg	1815	1898	with the rank of GFM à la suite of the army, Minister President of Prussia
1905	Bernhard III, Duke of Saxe-Meiningen	1851	1928	with the rank of a GFM, Inspector of the Army
1905	Frederick II, Grand Duke of Baden	1857	1928	with the rank of an Inspector of the Army
1908	Hans von Plessen	1841	1929	with the rank of a GFM, adjudant general of the Empire and commander of the HQ
1909	Prince Henry of Prussia	1862	1929	with the rank of a GFM, à la suite of the Prussian Army, also Großadmiral and Inspector-General of the Navy
1910	Prince Friedrich Leopold of Prussia	1856	1931	à la suite of the Prussian Army
1911	Prince Christian of Schleswig-Holstein	1831	1917	à la suite of the Prussian Army
1911	Gustav von Kessel	1846	1918	adjudant general of the Empire, Commander-in-Chief in the so-called Marken and Governor of Berlin
1911	Carl von Horn	1847	1923	War Minister of Bavaria
1912	Otto Kreß von Kressenstein	1850	1929	War Minister of Bavaria
1913	Duke Philipp of Württemberg	1838	1917	à la suite Army of Württemberg
1913	Maximilian von Prittwitz	1848	1917	Prussian army commander
1914	Moriz von Lyncker	1853	1932	Chief of the Military cabinet
1914	Friedrich von Scholl	1846	1928	adjudant general of the Empire
1914	Helmuth von Moltke the Younger	1848	1916	Chief of the German General Staff
1914	Josias von Heeringen	1850	1926	Prussian Minister of War and army commander
1914	Max Freiherr von Hausen	1846	1922	Minister-President of Saxony and German Army commander
1914	Alexander von Kluck	1846	1934	Prussian army commander
1914	Moritz von Bissing	1844	1917	Prussian General Governorate of Belgium
1915	Karl von Einem	1853	1934	Prussian army commander
1915	Otto von Marchtaler	1854	1920	War Minister of Württemberg
1917	Günther Graf von Kirchbach	1850	1925	Prussian army group commander
1918	Felix Graf von Bothmer	1852	1937	Bavarian army commander
1918	Karl Ludwig d'Elsa	1849	1922	Saxonian army commander
1918	Hans von Kirchbach	1849	1928	Saxonian army commander

== Weimar Republic ==
=== Reichswehr ===
- 1926 – Hans von Seeckt (1866–1936), Chief of the Oberste Heeresleitung.
- 1930 – Wilhelm Heye (1869–1946), Chief of the Oberste Heeresleitung.
- 1934 – Kurt Freiherr von Hammerstein-Equord (1878–1943), Chief of the Oberste Heeresleitung.

== Third Reich ==
=== Heer ===
See also: ⇒ World War II German Army ranks and insignia

Insignia

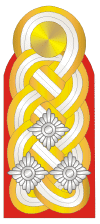

Epaulette

Collar tabs

Promoted	Name	Born	Died	Notes
20 Apr 1936	Werner von Fritsch	1880	1939	Commander-in-Chief of the Oberkommando des Heeres
1 Nov 1938	Ludwig Beck	1880	1944	Chief of the German General Staff
1 Jan 1939	Wilhelm Adam	1877	1949	Commander-in-Chief of the Heeresgruppe 2 in Kassel (1938)
1 Oct 1939	Johannes Blaskowitz	1883	1948	8th Army (Wehrmacht) - 9th Army (Wehrmacht) - 1st Army (Wehrmacht) - Army Group G - Army Group H - 25th Army (Wehrmacht)
19 July 1940	Friedrich Dollmann	1882	1944	7th Army (Wehrmacht)
19 July 1940	Nikolaus von Falkenhorst	1885	1968	Army HC Norwegen
19 July 1940	Friedrich Fromm	1888	1945	Replacement Army
19 July 1940	Heinz Guderian	1888	1954	Panzer Group Guderian - 2nd Panzer Army -Chief of the German General Staff
19 July 1940	Curt Haase	1881	1943	15th Army (Wehrmacht)
19 July 1940	Franz Halder	1884	1972	Chief of the German General Staff
19 July 1940	Hermann Hoth	1885	1971	17th Army (Wehrmacht) - 4th Panzer Army - Panzer Group Hoth
19 July 1940	Erich Hoepner	1886	1944	4th Panzer Army
19 July 1940	Eugen Ritter von Schobert	1883	1941	11th Army (Wehrmacht)
19 July 1940	Adolf Strauß	1879	1973	9th Army (Wehrmacht)
1 Jan 1942	Georg-Hans Reinhardt	1887	1963	3rd Panzer Army - Army Group Center
1 Jan 1942	Rudolf Schmidt	1886	1957	2nd Panzer Army
1 Apr 1942	Richard Ruoff	1883	1967	4th Panzer Army - 17th Army (Wehrmacht) - Panzer Group Ruoff - 17th Army (Wehrmacht)
1 June 1942	Eduard Dietl	1890	1944	Lapland Army - 20th Mountain Army
5 July 1942	Georg Lindemann	1884	1963	18th Army (Wehrmacht) - Army Group North
4 Dec 1942	Hans-Jürgen von Arnim	1889	1962	5th Panzer Army - Army Group Africa
1 Jan 1943	Gotthard Heinrici	1886	1971	4th Army (Wehrmacht) - 1st Panzer Army - Army Group Vistula
1 Jan 1943	Hans von Salmuth	1888	1962	2nd Army (Wehrmacht) - 15th Army (Wehrmacht)
30 Jan 1943	Walter Heitz	1878	1944	VIII Army Corps (Wehrmacht)
6 July 1943	Eberhard von Mackensen	1889	1969	1st Panzer Army - 14th Army (Wehrmacht)
1 Sep 1943	Heinrich Gottfried von Vietinghoff-Scheel	1887	1952	9th Army (Wehrmacht) - 15th Army (Wehrmacht) - 10th Army (Wehrmacht) - Army Group Kurland - Army Group C
1 Sep 1943	Karl-Adolf Hollidt	1891	1985	6th Army (Wehrmacht)
30 Jan 1944	Alfred Jodl	1890	1946	Chief of the Operations Staff of the Armed Forces High Command (Oberkommando der Wehrmacht, or OKW)
30 Jan 1944	Erwin Jaenecke	1890	1960	17th Army (Wehrmacht)
30 Jan 1944	Walter Weiß	1890	1967	2nd Army (Wehrmacht) - Army Group North
30 Jan 1944	Kurt Zeitzler	1895	1963	Chief of the German General Staff
20 Apr 1944	Josef Harpe	1887	1968	9th Army (Wehrmacht) - 4th Panzer Army - Army Group North Ukraine - Army Group A - 5th Panzer Army
1 Apr 1944	Lothar Rendulic	1887	1971	2nd Panzer Army - 20th Mountain Army
1 Apr 1944	Hans-Valentin Hube	1890	1944	1st Panzer Army
23 July 1944	Johannes Frießner	1892	1971	Army Group Friessner - Army Group North - Army Group South Ukraine - Army Group South
15 Aug 1944	Erhard Raus	1889	1956	4th Panzer Army - 1st Panzer Army - 3rd Panzer Army
7 May 1945	Carl Hilpert	1888	1947	16th Army (Wehrmacht) - Army Group Kurland

=== Luftwaffe ===
⇒ See also: Military Ranks of the Luftwaffe (1935–1945)

Insignia

Epaulette

Collar tabs

Sleeve badge

Promoted	Name	Born	Died	Notes
1943	Otto Deßloch	1889	1977	Commanding general Luftflotte 4
1940	Ulrich Grauert	1889	1941	
1942	Hans Jeschonnek	1899	1943	
1940	Alfred Keller	1882	1974	
1944	Günther Korten	1898	1944	posthumous promotion
1941	Alexander Löhr	1885	1947	
1943	Bruno Loerzer	1891	1960	
1942	Günther Rüdel	1883	1950	
1944	Kurt Student	1890	1978	
1940	Hans-Jürgen Stumpff	1889	1968	
1940	Ernst Udet	1896	1941	
1940	Hubert Weise	1884	1950	

=== SS ===
SS Oberst-Gruppenführer and Generaloberst of the Waffen-SS:

Insignia

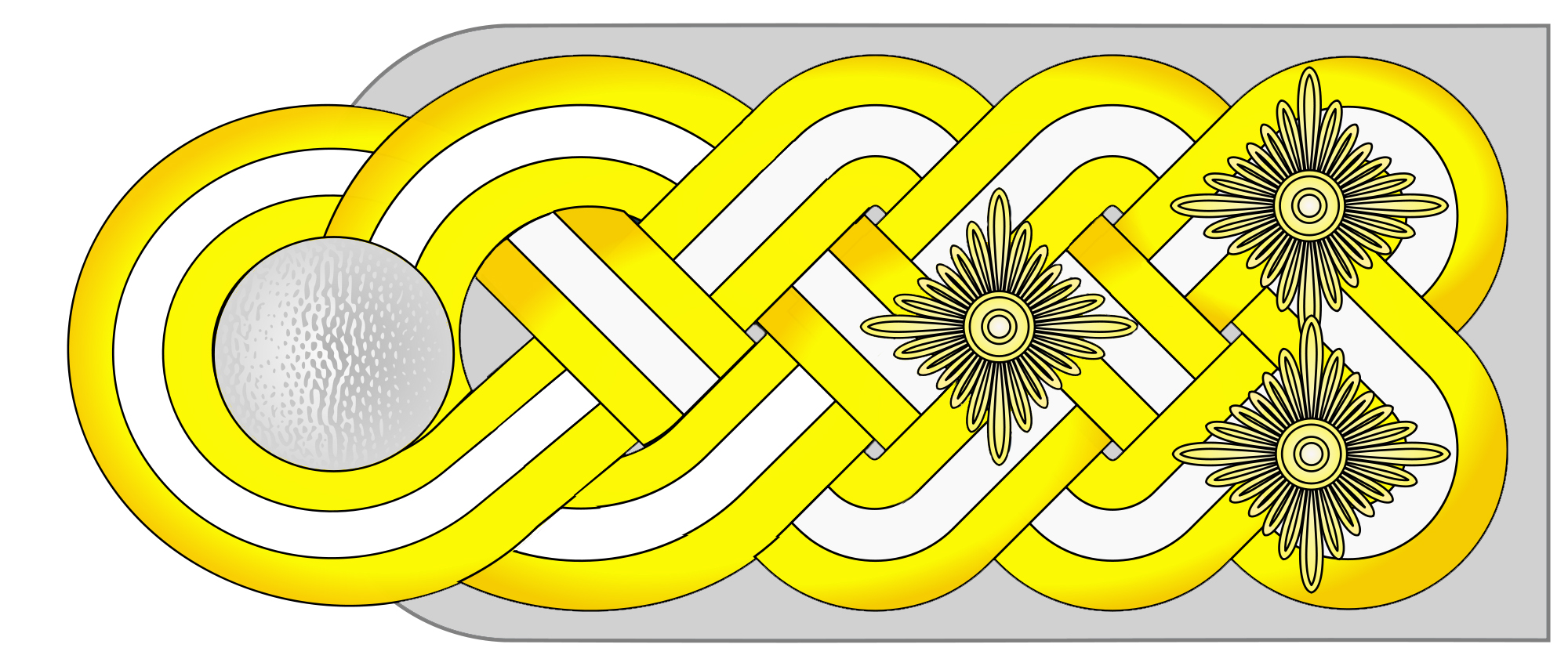

Epaulette

Collar tabs

Sleeve badge

- 1942 - Paul Hausser (1880–1972)
- 1944 - Sepp Dietrich (1892–1966)

SS Oberst-Gruppenführer and Generaloberst of the Police:

Insignia

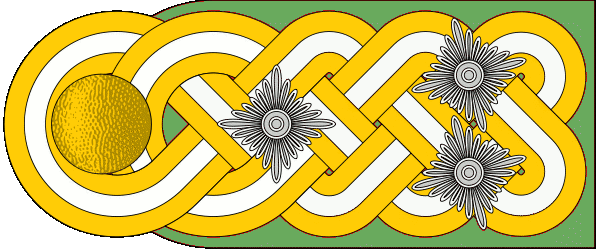

Epaulette

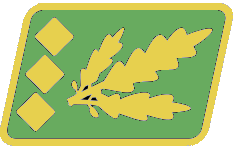

Collar tabs

- 1942 - Kurt Daluege (1897-1946)

== German Democratic Republic (GDR) ==
=== National People's Army ===
⇒ See also: Rank insignias

Insignias

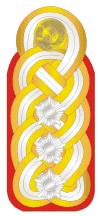

Epaulette

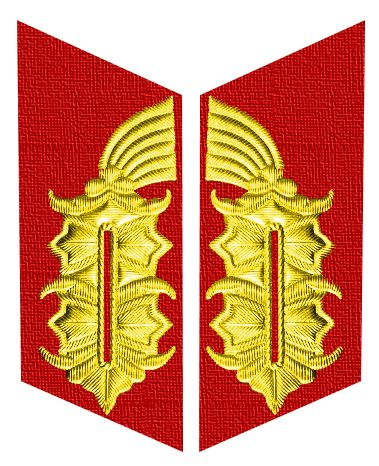

Collar tabs

Promoted	Name	Born	Died	Notes
1966	Kurt Wagner	1903	1989	Deputy Defence minister and Chief of Training
1972	Herbert Scheibe	1914	1991	Commanding General of the Kommando LSK/LV
1976	Horst Stechbarth	1925	2016	Commanding General of the Land Forces
1977	Werner Fleißner	1922	1985	Deputy Defence minister and Chief of the Technology and Armament Department
1979	Erich Peter	1919	1987	Deputy Defence minister and Commanding General of the Border Troops
1979	Fritz Streletz	1926	2025	Deputy Defence minister and Chief of Staff of the Defence Ministry
1979	Wolfgang Reinhold	1923	2012	Deputy Defence minister and Commanding General of the Kommando LSK/LV
1986	Joachim Goldbach	1929	2008	Deputy Defence minister and Chief of the Technology and Armament Department
1987	Horst Brünner	1929	2008	Deputy Defence minister and Chief of the Central Political Administration of the NVA
1988	Klaus-Dieter Baumgarten	1931	2008	Deputy Defence minister and Commanding General of the Border Troops
1989	Fritz Peter	1927		Chief of the Civil defense of the GDR

=== Ministerium für Staatssicherheit (MfS) ===
- Bruno Beater (1914–1982)
- Werner Großmann (1929–2022)
- Rudi Mittig (1925–1994)
- Markus Wolf (1923–2006)

=== German Volkspolizei (DVP) ===
- Karl Maron (1903–1975)
- Karl-Heinz Wagner (1928–2011)

== See also ==
- Comparative officer ranks of World War I
- Comparative officer ranks of World War II
- List of Austro-Hungarian colonel generals
- Generaloberst
