= Operation Doomsday =

1945 occupation of Norway by the 1st Airborne Division

- Part of: the Second World War; Allied occupation of Norway
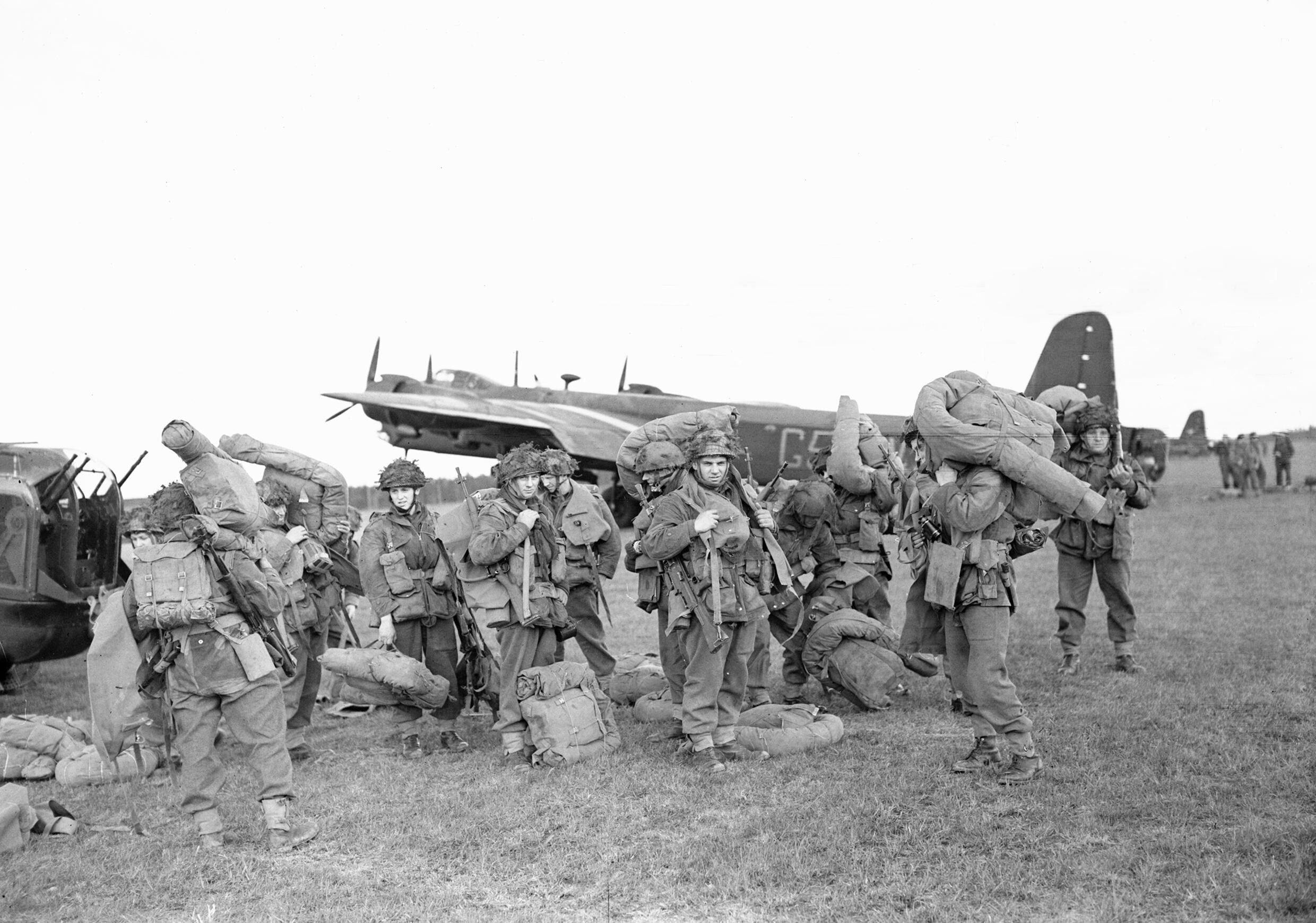
- British airborne troops, just disembarked from Stirling aircraft at Gardermoen airfield near Oslo
Date	9 May – August 1945
Location	Norway 59°54′39.51″N 10°43′21.56″E
Result	Peaceful occupation

Belligerents
United Kingdom; (Norway) Norwegian Government In Exile	Germany; (Norway) National Government

Commanders and leaders
Andrew Thorne; Roy Urquhart	Franz Böhme

Units involved
British 1st Airborne Division	German 20th Mountain Army

Strength
6,000	~350,000

Casualties and losses
47 killed and injured	All surrendered

In Operation Doomsday, the British 1st Airborne Division acted as a police and military force during the Allied occupation of Norway in May 1945, immediately after the victory in Europe during the Second World War. The division maintained law and order until the arrival of the remainder of Force 134, the occupation force. During its time in Norway, the division supervised the surrender of the German forces in Norway, as well as preventing the sabotage of military and civilian facilities.

The German Instrument of Surrender was delivered on 8 May to General Franz Böhme, the commander of all German forces stationed in Norway, and the 1st Airborne Division landed near Oslo and Stavanger between 9 and 11 May. The majority of the transport aircraft carrying the division landed safely, but three planes crashed with several fatalities. The division encountered little of the expected German resistance. Operational duties included welcoming back King Haakon VII of Norway, looking after Allied ex-prisoners of war, arresting war criminals and supervising the clearing of minefields. The division was also able to confirm the deaths of the British airborne troops that had taken part in Operation Freshman, an unsuccessful attempt to disrupt the German nuclear energy project in November 1942. The division returned to Britain at the end of August and disbanded two months later.

== Background ==
From 1943 the Western Allies had been planning the occupation of Norway, code-named Operation Apostle, after the German surrender. Force 134, the occupation force, was composed of Norwegian troops who were stationed in Scotland, as well as a British contingent (initially the 52nd (Lowland) Infantry Division), a few American troops and about 12,000 Norwegian police troops in Sweden. In the event of an emergency, the Supreme Headquarters Allied Expeditionary Force would send troops from Germany.

The operation came under Headquarters Scottish Command (General Andrew Thorne). Thorne had been appointed to Scottish Command, partly because of a belief in British military circles that Adolf Hitler held him in high regard. Thorne had met Hitler while serving as British Military Attaché in Berlin (1934–1935). Following Commando raids in Norway during 1941, Hitler had ordered substantial reinforcements for Norway, and the British hoped that the appointment Thorne as head of Scottish Command would "focus the Führer's attention on the threat [that the Allies] posed to [Axis forces] in Scandinavia". Thorne reportedly regarded his post as "being banished to Scotland".

Two scenarios were considered in planning for Operation Apostle. The first, known as 'Rankin C (Norway)' was based on the assumption that all German forces occupying Norway would surrender as part of a general unconditional surrender by Germany. The second was known as 'Rankin B' and assumed that there was no surrender and that only parts of Norway would be abandoned by the Germans to reinforce their troops stationed in north-western Europe against Allied advances there; in this scenario, Force 134 would encounter severe German resistance. The development of plans for the liberation and administration of Norway were complicated by it being difficult to predict whether the landings would be opposed and the extent of damage resulting from Allied bombardments and any German "scorched earth" demolitions. Planning for the administration of Norway was detailed and flexible.

Either of the two Rankins would be difficult for Thorne to accomplish as the troops for Force 134 were meagre; from late 1943 the majority of military resources were absorbed to the campaign in north-west Europe. In September 1944 Thorne was even deprived of the 52nd Lowland Division, which was attached to the 1st Allied Airborne Army by the War Office and earmarked for Operation Market Garden. Thorne was later given the 1st Airborne Division (Major General Roy Urquhart). Because of the severe casualties the division had suffered during Market Garden, it would not be combat ready until 1 May 1945, after receiving many replacements. Thorne would have to make use of Milorg, the Norwegian Resistance. The Allied civil affairs planners liaised with the Norwegian Government in exile in London as well as Milorg. By the end of the war, Milorg had been preparing for the arrival of an Allied force for some time; its 40,000 members were well-armed, trained and led by more than 100 Special Operations Executive agents parachuted into Norway. It was ready to prevent any sabotage of key communication centres and other important facilities by German troops if they resisted the Allies.

== Prelude ==
=== Allied preparations ===
By early May 1945, 1st Airborne Division had been brought up to strength, albeit mainly with inexperienced replacements. The 4th Parachute Brigade had been disbanded and its battalions merged with those of 1st Parachute Brigade after the Battle of Arnhem and replaced by 1st Independent Polish Parachute Brigade. The Norwegian Parachute Company was also attached to the 1st Airborne Division. On 4 May, Urquhart was ordered to despatch the 1st Independent Polish Brigade to Dunkirk, and to detach the 1st Parachute Brigade from the division; one of the brigade's battalions would immediately be transported to Denmark for occupation duties, with the rest of the Brigade remaining in Britain as a reserve. The rest of the division was warned that it would soon be transported by air to Norway as part of the occupation force, with the Special Air Service Brigade being temporarily attached to the division to replace 1st Parachute Brigade. Urquhart informed Thorne that the division could be ready for deployment in 48 hours, far less time than Thorne and his staff had expected. When it entered Norway, the division would be responsible for maintaining law and order in the areas it occupied, ensuring that German units followed the terms of their surrender, securing captured airfields and preventing the sabotage of military and civilian infrastructure. The division would be formed of three brigades: 1st Airlanding Brigade, Special Air Service Brigade and an ad hoc Artillery Brigade formed from divisional troops.

The 1st Airlanding Brigade would land near to the Norwegian capital, Oslo and occupy the city with other elements of Force 134. The commander, Brigadier R. H. Bower, would become Commander, Oslo Area. Oslo was chosen because it was the Norwegian capital, as well as being the centre of Norwegian and German administration. The Artillery Brigade would land at Stavanger and its commanding officer, Brigadier R.G. Loder-Symonds, would become Commander, Stavanger Area. Stavanger was the closest airfield to Britain and would also be useful as a fighter base. The Special Air Service Brigade would also land in Stavanger, from where it would advance to and occupy the area around Kristiansand. This was an important port from which the Royal Navy minesweepers would begin mine-clearing. Operations would be divided into four phases on consecutive days. On 8 May, fifteen transport aircraft would carry advance parties to airfields at Gardermoen, near Oslo and Sola airfield by Stavanger; this was to be completed by the evening. The second phase, on 9 May, would see seventy Handley Page Halifaxes transport the 1st Airlanding Brigade and elements of Headquarters, 1st Airborne Division to both airfields and another seventy-six C-47 Dakotas would land the Artillery Brigade at Sola. On 10 May, the third phase would see Special Air Service Brigade land at Sola and stores and vehicles would be landed at both airfields on 11 May. Before the division arrived, specially selected Allied representatives known as Heralds would accompany German diplomatic delegates to Norway; only when they signalled that the airfields were clear to land on would the first transport aircraft take off from Britain.

=== Axis preparations ===
German forces had started a gradual withdrawal to northernmost Finland in early September 1944 in Operation Birke. As the value of Petsamo region had decreased, the Germans decided in early October 1944 to abandon Finland and most of northern Norway and had begun Operation Nordlicht (Northern Light), a retreat into prepared positions in Lyngen Municipality in northern Norway. Nordlicht had come to an end at the beginning of January 1945, with only a few miles of Finnish territory remaining in German hands and several isolated garrisons in Norwegian Finnmark. Soviet forces occupied eastern Finnmark, and the USSR asked that Western Allied forces be landed to support them. Only a company of Norwegian mountain infantry could be spared for this, though the British and Norwegian governments provided food supplies for the civilian population in the area. Due to the failure of the Battle of the Bulge and the fact that several new types of U-boat were ready to be deployed, the German positions in Norway became of great value to Grand Admiral Karl Dönitz, Commander-in-Chief of the Naval High Command, to continue submarine warfare against the Allies and to Hitler, who denied requests from General Heinz Guderian that divisions should be withdrawn from Norway for use in the defence of Germany. Böhme had urged in March that northern Norway should be abandoned and that construction of submarine pens should cease for a lack of materials. Hitler feared that a withdrawal might tempt neutral Sweden to enter the war in support of the Allies, and that a withdrawal from northern Norway would endanger U-boat bases in the south. Until the last days of the war, Dönitz believed that Norway should be kept for U-boat operations and on 3 May the Seekriegsleitung (Naval Warfare Command) informed the U-boat staff that even if Germany was occupied, submarines would still sail from Norway. Only on 4 May were orders issued by Oberkommando der Wehrmacht that all German troops in Norway were to avoid actions that might provoke the Allies.

In May 1945, German troops in Norway came under the command of the 20th Mountain Army (General Franz Böhme) that had absorbed the Army Norway on 18 December 1944. Böhme had succeeded General Lothar Rendulic as Armed Forces Commander, Norway in January 1945. At the beginning of May, Böhme informed Dönitz, the new German President, with the death of Adolf Hitler, that that the forces in Norway consisted of eleven divisions and five brigades (350,000–380,000 troops). There were also U-boats stationed in naval bases in Norway, including 10 Type XXI submarines and 17 Type XXIII submarines. Though Allied forces had entered Germany and rumours were rife about an invasion of Norway, the 20th Mountain Army almost seemed to be at a peace-time status; Böhme had complained in January that there were some units in the Army that took Sunday off, and that he could do little to stop it. With only about 30,000 Allied troops on hand, the surrender of Norway to Allied forces was not immediately accepted by General Montgomery, and would instead be accomplished through negotiations with Thorne.

== Occupation ==
=== Arrival ===
In the early hours of 7 May, Dönitz commanded all German military forces unconditionally to surrender and on 8 May the German Instrument of Surrender was delivered to General Böhme. The Germans were to withdraw from all Norwegian towns and the Swedish border and gradually redeploy to areas designated for disarmament; all senior Nazi party officials and security personnel were immediately to be arrested. Force 134 would be greatly outnumbered during this; 30,000 Allied troops would have to supervise the disarmament of more than 350,000 German troops. There were fears that the German forces might refuse to surrender and instead resist the Allied occupation forces and there were concerns about what the large detachment of Kriegsmarine personnel at the port of Trondheim might do.

Although the first phase of the operation had been scheduled for 8 May, no word was received from the 'Heralds' and so Doomsday was postponed by twenty-four hours. Contact was established on 9 May and the first units of Force 134 arrived in Norway to begin their occupation, including the advanced elements of the 1st Airborne Division and the Norwegian Parachute Company. All but one of the transport aircraft of the first phase took off and landed in Norway without incident. Phase II was accelerated to compensate for the delay, with aircraft scheduled to leave Britain between 02:00 and 13:30. Unfortunately, after approximately 07:00, poor weather over Oslo caused many transport aircraft heading for the airfield there to return to Britain, although all of those destined for Stavanger landed.

Several crash-landed, including a Short Stirling (LK147/ZO-Z from 196 Squadron) that crashed in dense fog just south of Gardermoen killing 14 soldiers and a crew of 6 and one reported missing. Later it was found that the missing Stirling (LK297/G5-G from 190 Squadron) had crashed, killing its occupants, including Air Vice-Marshal James Scarlett-Streatfeild. The remaining aircraft took off again on 11 May, with one crashing on takeoff and yet another going missing; this one had landed at another airfield in Norway. The aircraft belonging to the next two phases suffered no casualties, although some were again delayed by inclement weather over the Norwegian airfields. The 1st Airborne Division suffered one officer and thirty-three other ranks killed, and one other rank wounded and the Royal Air Force six killed and seven injured. All of these losses had occurred after the general surrender had been declared.

=== Occupation ===
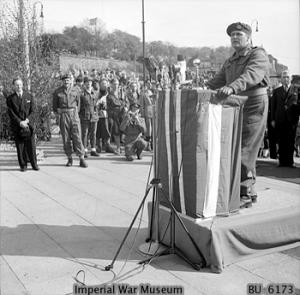
Crown Prince Olav addressing the welcoming crowd at Oslo, accompanied by Major General Urquhart.

The original plan for the division called for two of the airborne battalions to march through Oslo on 10 May, but the delay meant that only a few troops had arrived. Two platoons from 2nd Battalion The South Staffordshire Regiment and four Military Policemen on motorcycles accompanied Urquhart, who rode in a commandeered German staff car. The soldiers, although somewhat nervous given the small size of their group, were greeted enthusiastically by the Norwegian population in Oslo. The only resistance came from the captains of several U-boats at Trondheim. Apart from this, the 1st Airborne Division encountered no trouble from the Germans, who co-operated with the airborne troops. The Germans were disarmed without incident, allowed themselves to be transferred to collection camps and also assisted in the clearing of numerous minefields they had sown during their occupation, which resulted in several German casualties.

Until the arrival of other units from Force 134, as well as the Headquarters, Allied Forces, Norway, Urquhart and his headquarters staff had complete control over Norwegian activities. Urquhart welcomed Crown Prince Olaf of Norway and three ministers representing the Norwegian Government when they arrived on a Royal Navy cruiser and the division also took part in the celebrations when King Haakon VII of Norway returned to his country from exile. Other duties for the division included rounding up alleged war criminals, ensuring that German troops were confined to their camps and reservations and with Royal Engineer assistance, clearing buildings of mines and other boobytraps. They were also given the responsibility of assisting Allied personnel who had been prisoners of war in Norway, many of whom were Russian. There were more than 80,000 Russian ex-prisoners of war, and many needed medical treatment because of the inhumane conditions of the camps in which they had been imprisoned. When a parade was held in late June to celebrate the Allied liberation, many of the Russians participated, wearing uniforms with Red Star badges they had made themselves. During the division's time in Norway, some 400 paratroopers under the command of Major Frederick Gough were temporarily transferred to the Netherlands, where they helped take part in Theirs Is the Glory, a documentary about the Battle of Arnhem.

The Norwegian resistance co-operated with the 1st Airborne Division, often providing liaison and performing guard duties, and the Norwegian population as a whole gave a warm welcome to the airborne troops. British forces were initially only in control of Oslo, Stavanger and Kristiansand with the resistance and, less commonly, local Norwegian authorities taking control of the rest of the country from the Germans. The resistance also helped the division discover the fate of 1st Airborne Division troops assigned to Operation Freshman, a failed attempt in November 1942 to sabotage the Norsk Hydro chemical plant at Vemork, which produced heavy water for the German nuclear energy project. Two gliders had been assigned to the operation, and both had crash-landed after being released by the aircraft towing them. The men who survived the crashes were executed shortly after being captured. Although the local Norwegian population could not prevent the prisoners being executed, they later recovered their remains and reinterred them in marked graves. When it arrived, the 1st Airborne Division was informed of the fate of the operation and cooperated with the Norwegian government to have a memorial erected and the fallen men buried with full military honours at Stavanger and Oslo.

== Aftermath ==
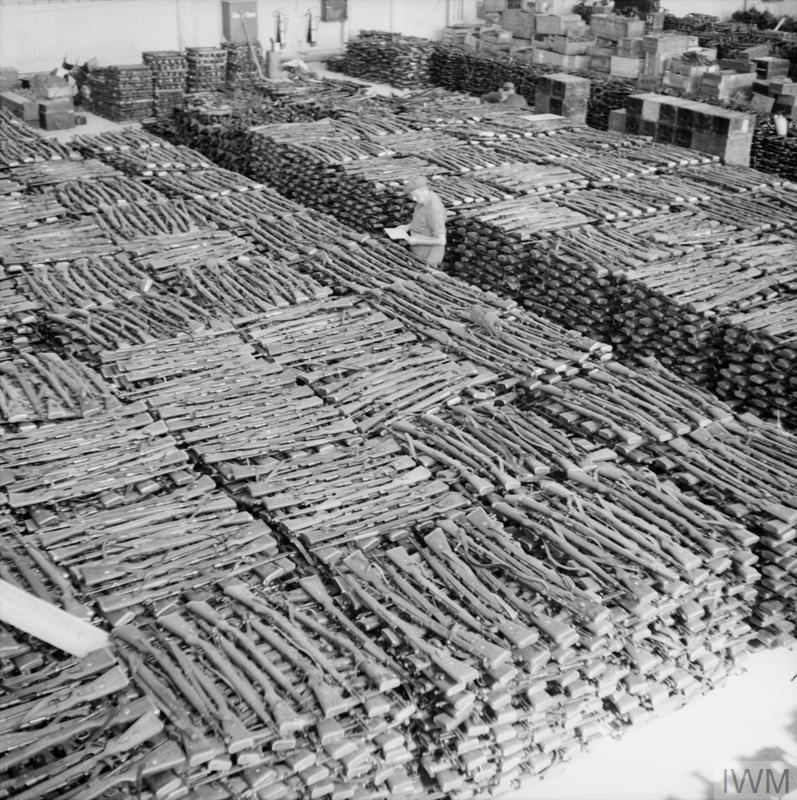
Storeroom at Sola aerodrome, Stavanger, holding some of the estimated 30,000 rifles taken from German forces in Norway after their surrender

The remaining units of Force 134 entered Norway throughout the rest of May, gradually reinforcing the airborne troops. On 10 May elements of the 12,000 strong Norwegian police force began to enter the country from Sweden, having been raised from young Norwegians who had fled to Sweden after Norway had been occupied in 1940. General Thorne arrived with the rest of his headquarters on 13 May and took up his position as Commander-in-Chief Allied Liberation Forces. In the next two weeks further elements of Force 134 arrived, including a composite American regiment, a Norwegian brigade, and two British infantry brigades composed of re-trained anti-aircraft gunners who replaced the Special Air Service Brigade. Thorne was the de facto Head of Government of Norway until 7 June, when King Haakon returned, and from then until his departure at the end of October was Commander-in-Chief of all military forces in Norway.

The1st Airborne Division was stationed in Norway until the end of the summer. It returned to Britain at the end of August, and its personnel were sent on leave. Initial plans had called for the division to be used as an Imperial Strategic Reserve, as it was believed that the 6th Airborne Division would be required in the Far Eastern Theatre. When Japan surrendered in August it negated the need for 6th Airborne Division to be transferred. Two airborne divisions existed, but only one was included in the planned post-war British Regular Army. Although the tradition of seniority might have called for the 6th Airborne Division to be disbanded as the junior airborne formation, the 1st Airborne Division was still understrength after Operation Market Garden and not fully trained. The division spent the next two months training and transferring troops to the 6th Airborne Division, and then disbanded on 15 November 1945.
