= 1st Airlanding Light Regiment =

WW2 British Army artillery unit

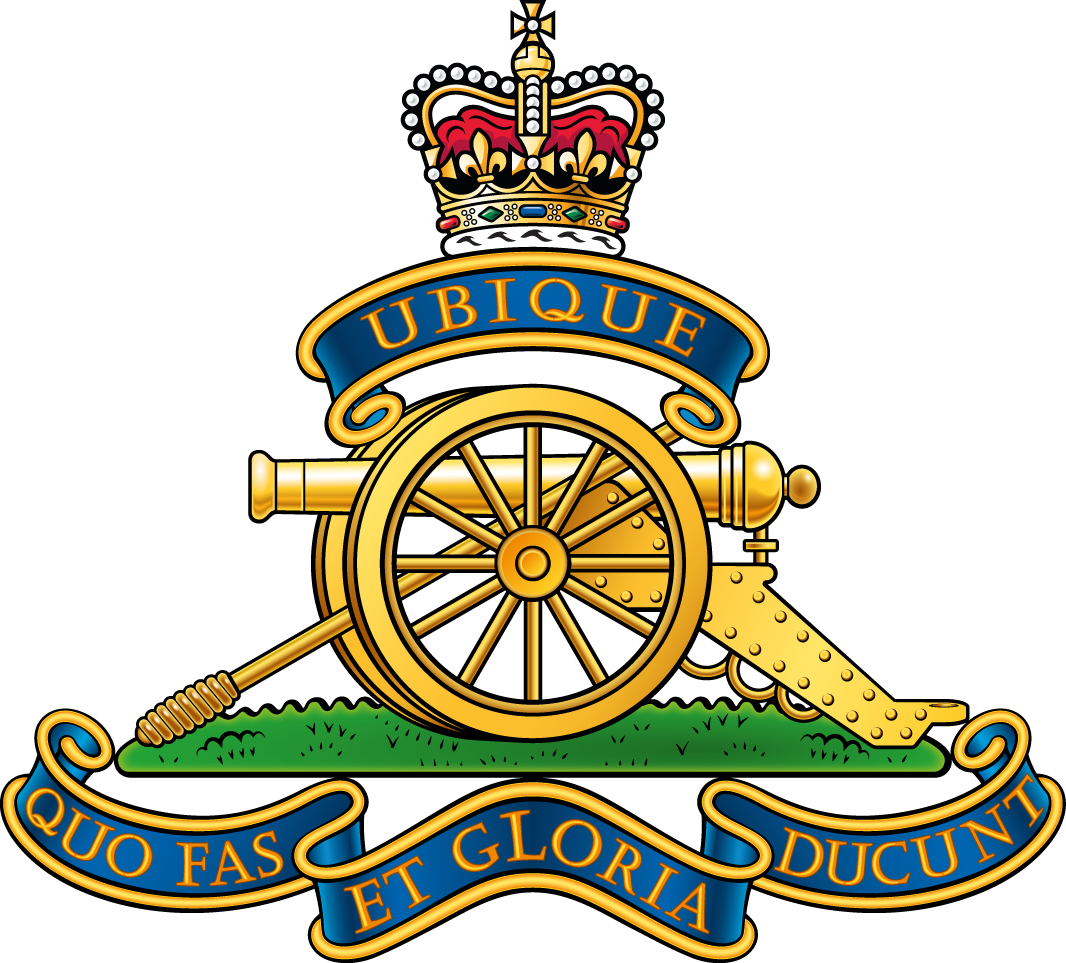
- Cap badge of the Royal Artillery
- Active: 1943–1945
- Country: United Kingdom
- Branch: British Army
- Type: Artillery
- Role: Airborne forces
- Size: Regiment
- Part of: 1st Airborne Division
- Motto: Ubique (Everywhere)
- Engagements: Operation Slapstick; Italian Campaign; Battle of Arnhem; Operation Doomsday

Commanders
- Notable commanders: Lieutenant Colonel W. F. K. Thompson

Insignia
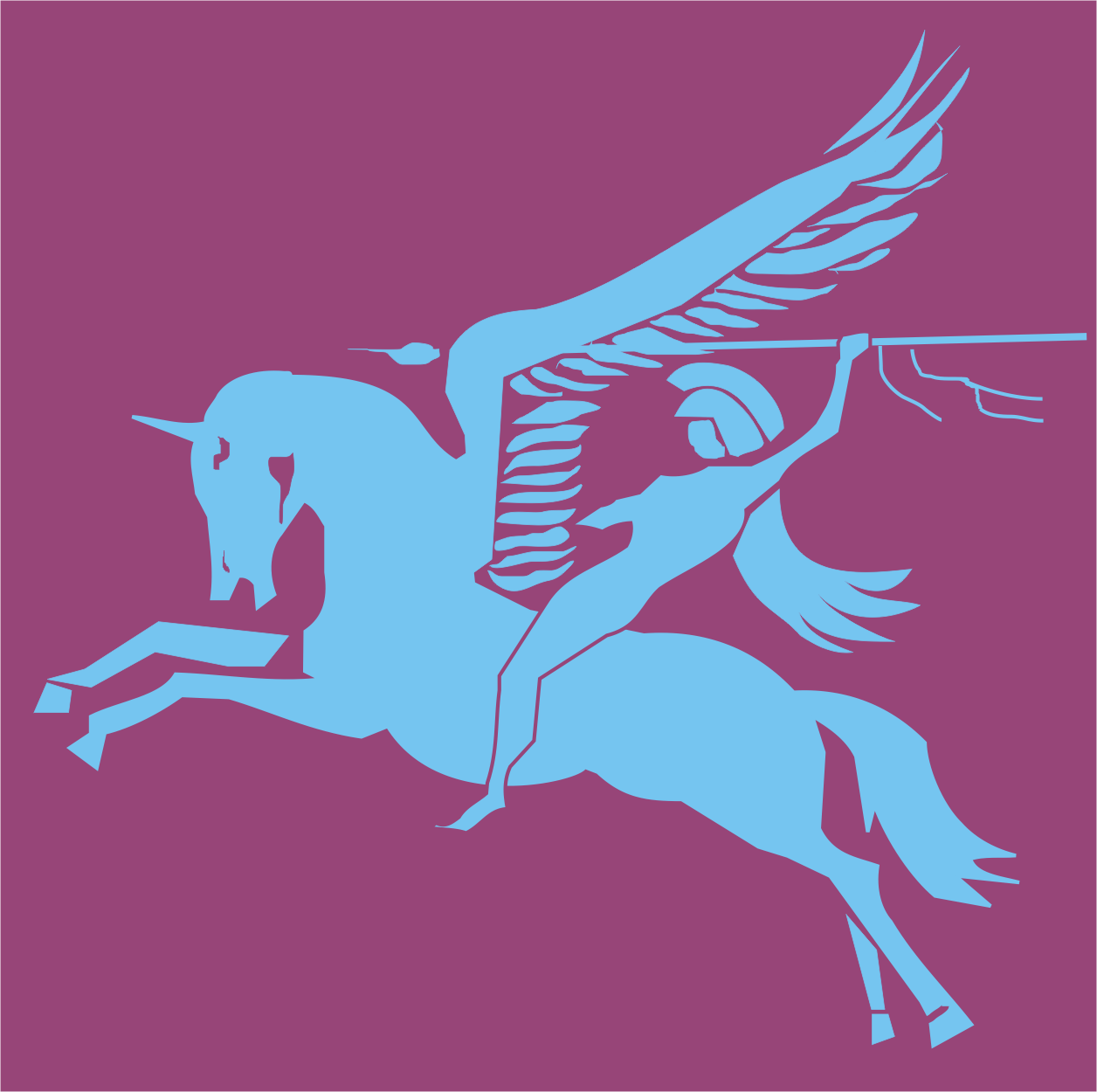
- Emblem of the British airborne forces

The 1st Airlanding Light Regiment was an airborne forces unit of the British Army's Royal Artillery during the Second World War.

The regiment was raised in 1943, by the expansion of an existing airborne artillery battery. Attached to the 1st Airborne Division in 1943, the regiment landed in Italy as part of Operation Slapstick—part of the Allied invasion of Italy—and then, when the division was withdrawn, it stayed behind to support other divisions of the British Eighth Army in the Italian Campaign until the end of the year. In 1944 the regiment rejoined the 1st Airborne Division in England and, in September 1944, took part in Operation Market Garden, which was the airborne assault in the Netherlands. During the battle of Arnhem that followed the regiment was one of the divisional units that formed a defensive ring around Oosterbeek.

Reformed after Arnhem, the regiment never fought in another battle. They did, however, take part in Operation Doomsday, the repatriation of the German occupation army in Norway in May 1945. After this the regiment returned to England and was disbanded in December 1945.

== Formation ==
Impressed by the success of German airborne operations during the Battle of France, the British Prime Minister, Winston Churchill, directed the War Office to investigate the possibility of creating a corps of 5,000 parachute troops. In September 1941 the 1st Parachute Brigade began forming, comprising three parachute infantry battalions. In keeping with British Army practice at the same time as the brigade's infantry battalions were forming, airborne supporting arms were formed including men from the Royal Artillery.

The origins of the 1st Airlanding Light Regiment can be traced to the formation of the 458th Independent Light Battery, Royal Artillery in February 1941. At the time, the battery was commanded by Major Pat Lloyd and, equipped with the First World War vintage 3.7-inch mountain howitzer, served on the North-West Frontier in India. The 3.7 inch Howitzer could fire a 20 pounds (9.1 kg) shell 5,899 yards (5,394 m) and weighed 1,610 pounds (730 kg).

In 1941, the British airborne forces were being raised and needed an artillery formation, so the battery was renamed the 1st Airlanding Light Battery and it was converted into an airborne unit. Assigned to the 1st Airborne Division, the battery moved to the airborne forces depot at Bulford Garrison in April 1942.

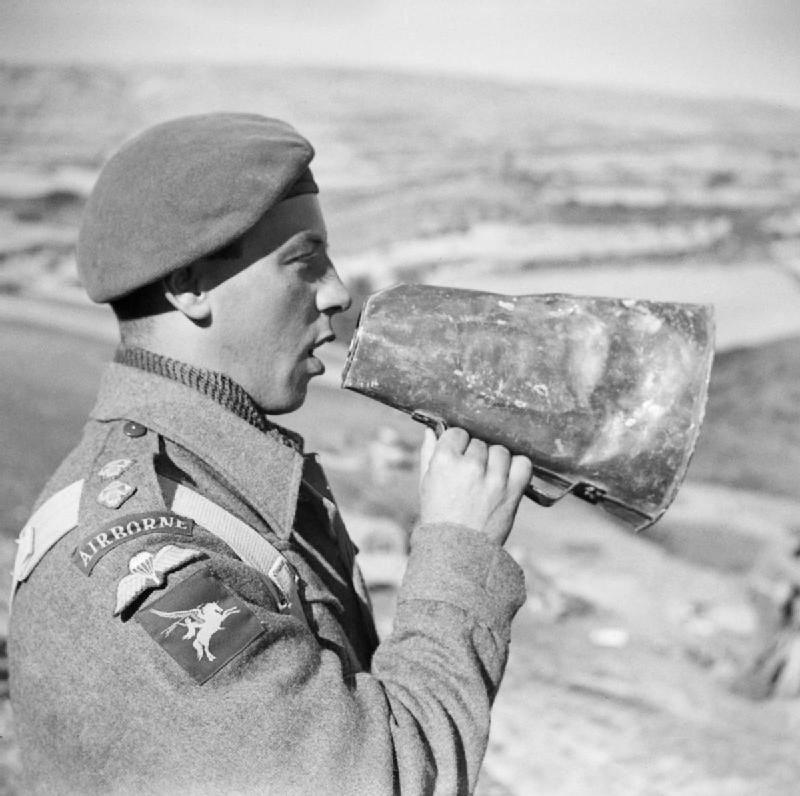
Airborne artillery Gun Position Officer, Italy 1943

The battery spent the next eleven months training for their new role. In February 1943, however, it was expanded to a full regiment commanded by Lieutenant-Colonel R. W. McLeod. The regiment now consisted of three batteries, each of two troops, with four guns per troop, or twenty-four guns in the regiment. At the same time their 3.7 inch Howitzers were replaced by the newer American 75 mm Pack Howitzer. The 75 mm Howitzer could be broken down into six components. It fired a 15 pounds (6.8 kg) shell a maximum of 9,186 yards (8,400 m) and weighed 1,439 pounds (653 kg). Being the only field artillery unit in the division, one battery of eight guns could be expected to support each of the division's three brigades. (Note: Other artillery units in the division, were an independent anti-tank battery assigned to each parachute brigade.)

At this time the only way airborne forces could transport artillery guns and their towing vehicles by air was by using gliders. In the regiment's case this was normally the Airspeed Horsa, piloted by two men from the Glider Pilot Regiment. With a wingspan of 88 feet (27 m) and a length of 67 feet (20 m), the Horsa had a maximum load capacity of 15,750 pounds (7,140 kg)—space for two pilots, a maximum of twenty-eight troops, or two jeeps; alternatively: one jeep, an artillery gun and a half ton trailer; or one jeep with up to two trailers. One disadvantage of being transported by the Horsa glider, was that only three artillerymen and the two pilots could be carried with the gun.

== Operations ==
=== Italy ===
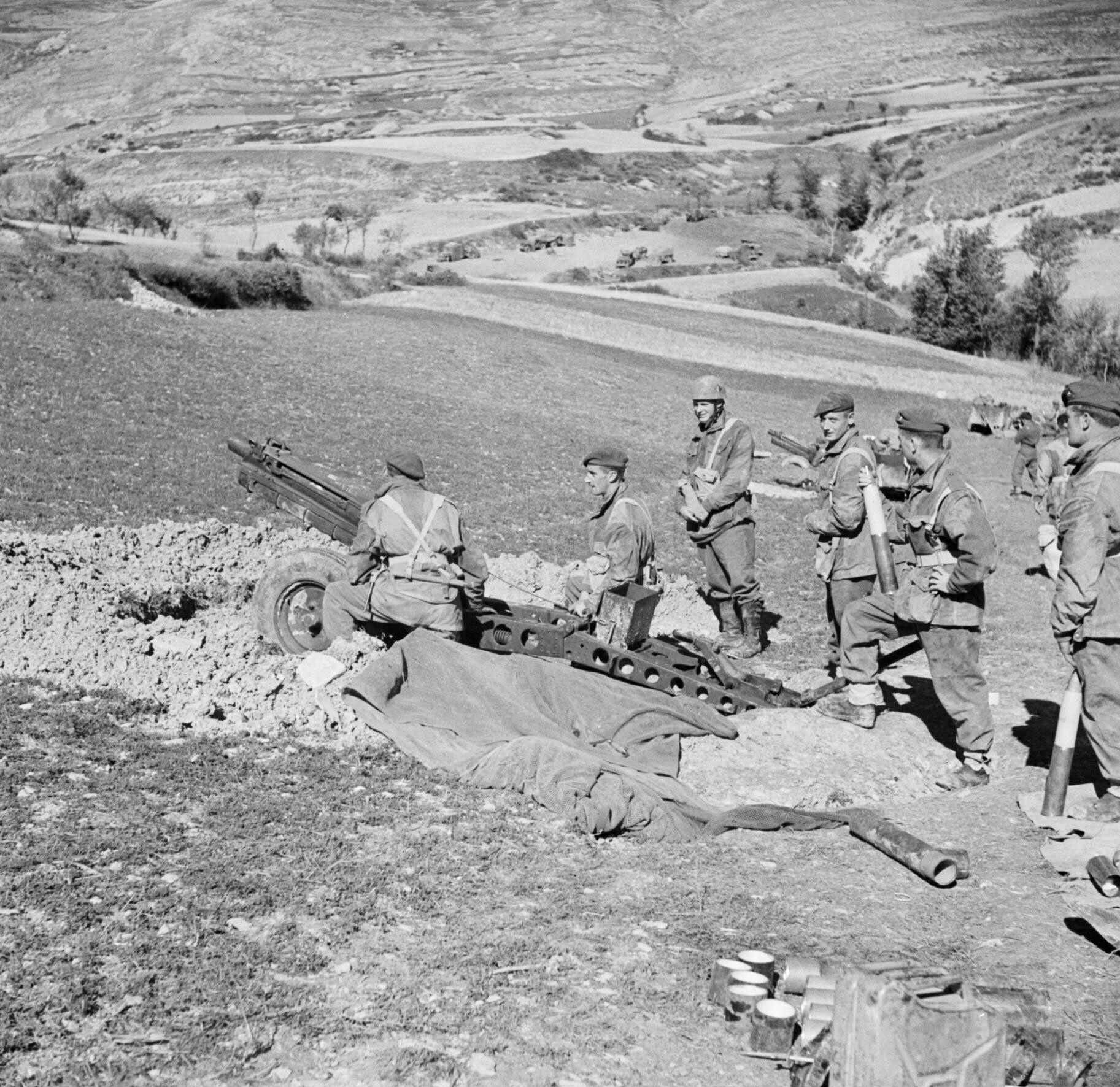
75 mm Howitzer and gun crew shooting in support of the British 5th Infantry Division, November 1943.

The regiment left England for North Africa on 16 May 1943, arriving at Oran in Algeria on 26 May. The 1st Airborne Division as a whole did not take part in the Allied invasion of Sicily. However, the 1st Parachute and 1st Airlanding brigades took part in brigade sized operations, Ladbroke and Fustian, without any artillery support from the regiment. While in Sicily Lieutenant-Colonel Crawfurd, the Division's Commander Royal Artillery (DCRA), was killed. He was replaced by Lieutenant-Colonel McLeod and the second in command, Major W. F. K "Sheriff" Thompson, was given command of the regiment.

In September 1943, they were involved in Operation Slapstick, part of the Allied invasion of Italy. The division in North Africa boarded the ships of the Royal Navy's 12th Cruiser Squadron at Bizerta on 8 September 1943. At 15:00 on 9 September, the flotilla reached the port of Taranto on the heel of Italy. The landings were unopposed and the troops were soon disembarked.

In Italy the regiment not only supported the 1st Airborne Division, but also fired in support of the 1st Canadian Infantry Division at Campobasso. The 1st Airborne Division was withdrawn back to England, leaving the regiment behind. In October they supported the British 5th Infantry Division at Rionero and then Isernia in November. After this, they supported the 2nd New Zealand Division during three unsuccessful attacks on Orsogna. Next they fired in support of the independent 2nd Parachute Brigade and the British 78th Infantry Division from mid-December 1943 to January 1944, at Casoli, Gessopalena and Roccascalegna. The regiment was then withdrawn and sent to rejoin the 1st Airborne Division in Boston, England.

=== England ===
In England the regiment trained for operations in North-West Europe under the supervision of I Airborne Corps, commanded by Lieutenant-General Frederick Arthur Montague Browning. Although they were not scheduled to take part in the Normandy landings, Operation Wastage was a contingency plan drawn up whereby all of the 1st Airborne Division would be parachuted in to support any of the five invasion beaches if delays were experienced. (Note: Other missions planned in June and July 1944 were: Operation Reinforcement a parachute drop to the west of St Sauveur-le-Vicomte to support the U.S. 82nd Airborne Division. Operation Wild Oats a drop onto Carpiquet airfield. Operation Beneficiary supporting U.S. XX Corps to capture St Malo. Operation Lucky Strike seizing the bridges crossing the River Seine at Rouen. Operation Sword Hilt cutting off the port of Brest and destroying the Morlaix viaduct. Operation Hands Up supporting the U.S. Third Army, under General George S. Patton, by seizing Vannes airfield. In August Operation Transfigure involved the British 1st and U.S. 101st Airborne Divisions, with the 52nd (Lowland) Infantry Division and Polish 1st Parachute Brigade landing at Rambouillet St Arnoult to close the gap between Orléans and Paris. Operation Axehead using the same force to seize bridges over the River Seine in support of 21st Army Group. Operation Boxer again using the same forces to seize Boulogne and attack V1 rocket sites. Near the end of August Operation Linnet, with the same units were to seize crossings over the Escaut, cutting off the retreating German armies. Operation Infatuate in early September involved 1st Airborne Corps, landing in the Scheldt estuary to threaten Antwerp.)

In early September the regiment prepared for Operation Comet during which the 1st Airborne Division's three brigades were to land in the Netherlands and capture three river crossings. The first of these was the bridge over the River Waal at Nijmegen, the second the bridge over the River Maas at Grave and finally the bridge over the River Rhine at Arnhem. Planning for Comet was well advanced when, on 10 September, the mission was cancelled. Instead, a new operation was proposed with the same objectives as Comet but to be carried out by three divisions of the First Allied Airborne Army.

=== Arnhem ===
Landings by the First Allied Airborne Army's three divisions began in the Netherlands on 17 September 1944. Although the allocation of aircraft for each division was roughly similar, the U.S. 101st Airborne Division, under Major General Maxwell D. Taylor, landing at Nijmegen would use only one lift. The U.S. 82nd Airborne Division, under Major General James M. Gavin, at Grave required two lifts while the British 1st Airborne Division, under Major-General Roy Urquhart, at Arnhem would need three lifts. Whereas the two American divisions delivered at least three-quarters of their infantry in their first lift, the 1st Airborne's similar drop used only half its capacity for infantry and the remainder to deliver vehicles and artillery.

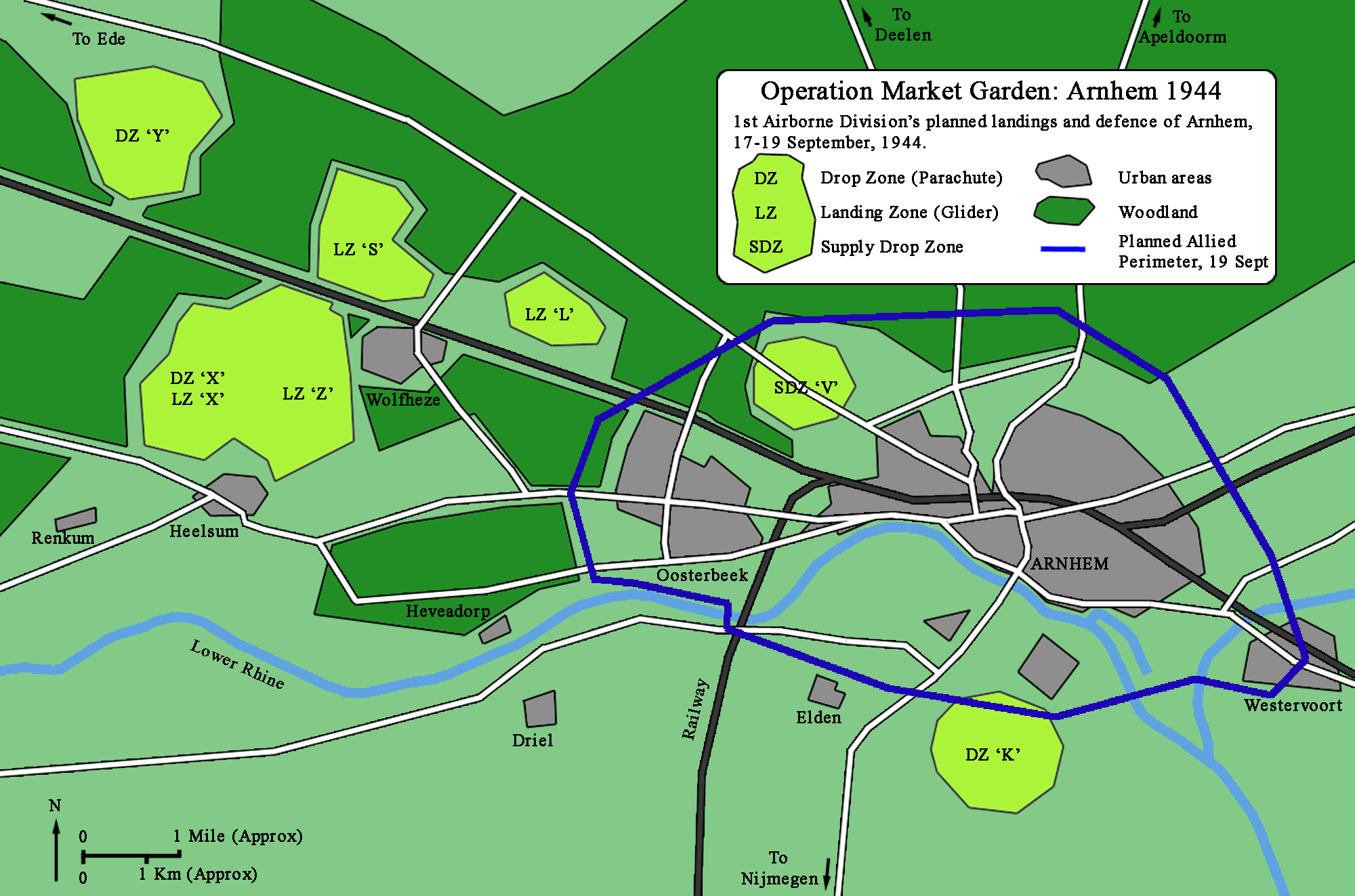
Map of the Arnhem area showing the planned drop and landing zones.

The 1st Airborne Division had the required airlift capacity to deliver all three parachute brigades with their glider-borne anti-tank weapons or two of the parachute brigades and the airlanding brigade on day one. Instead however, the vast majority of the division's vehicles and heavy equipment, plus the 1st Parachute Brigade, most of the 1st Airlanding Brigade and divisional troops were to be on the first lift, with the rest to follow over the next two days. Following the first lift, the airlanding brigade would remain at the landing grounds to defend them for the following day's lifts, while the parachute brigade set out alone to capture the bridges and ferry crossing on the River Rhine.

On 17 September 1944, the first day of the operation, fifty-seven gliders carried the regimental headquarters and the 1st and 3rd batteries to Arnhem. The 2nd Battery and the remaining men of the regimental headquarters were on the second day's lift.

With only three of the regiment's men travelling in the gliders, the two pilots stayed with the guns as drivers and to provide local protection, until the rest of the regiment assembled. Immediately after landing the 3rd Battery set up their gun line to the east of landing zone 'Z'. Meanwhile, the 1st Battery set up between the 3rd and the village of Wolfheze. Both were on call to support the 1st Parachute Brigade in their advance to the bridges, and the 1st Airlanding Brigade defending the landing zones.

In the morning of the second day, 19 September, in order to support the paratroopers in Arnhem, the guns had to move to a new position beside the church in Oosterbeek. The batteries were set up on the slight high ground that existed to the north-east and north-west of the church. At the Arnhem road bridge, the 2nd Parachute Battalion, commanded by Lieutenant Colonel John Frost, and some supporting units, were under attack by the reconnaissance battalion of the 9th SS Panzer Division, which was attempting to force a crossing. The regiment's guns were called into action and caused significant damage to the un-armoured vehicles, armoured cars and half-tracks. Later they targeted German mortars firing at the 1st Parachute Battalion trying to fight through to the bridge in Arnhem. Their guns were also called upon to break up German attacks on the landing zones, still defended by the 1st Airlanding Brigade, which were in danger of being overrun. When the thirty-three gliders of the 2nd Battery that were on the second lift, arrived from around 15:00, one of their guns was damaged on landing and had to be left behind. By that afternoon, the attempt to fight through to the 2nd Parachute Battalion at the Arnhem bridge had failed and the remnants of four battalions involved started arriving at the regiment's position.

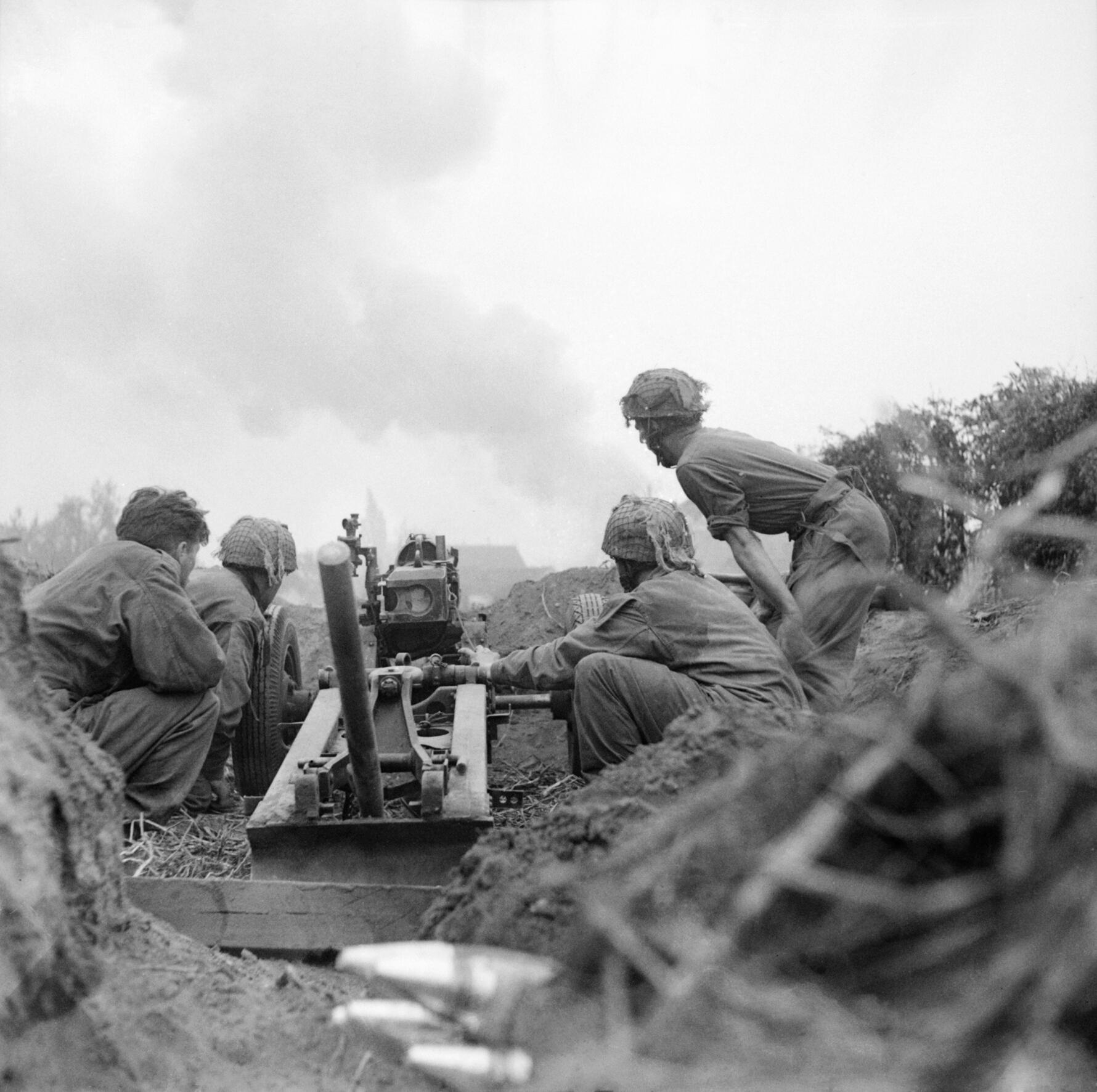
75 mm gun and crew at Oosterbeek, 20 September 1944.

On 20 September the division had been forced into a perimeter around Oosterbeek. The regiment was provided with local protection by five flights of the Glider Pilot Regiment. (Note: Flights in the Glider Pilot Regiment were the equivalent to an infantry platoon.) A group made up from the remnants of the 1st Parachute Brigade known as Lonsdale Force was to their right. While on the left was 'D' Company, 1st Battalion, Border Regiment. All that morning the Germans using tanks, self propelled artillery and infantry attempted to break through the British line and reach the regiment's guns from the east.

On 21 September, the fifth day of the operation, the Germans again attacked from the east and got within 300 yards (270 m) of the guns. Engaged in hand-to-hand fighting, infantry support was requested and the guns were firing at point blank range. German artillery attacked the gun line killing and wounding a number of men. Amongst the wounded was the commanding officer, Lieutenant-Colonel Thompson. One of the men defending the guns was Major Robert Cain who was part of Lonsdale force. Cain was wounded disabling a Tiger tank, after which he brought one of the regiment's guns forward to finish it off. Cain was later awarded the Victoria Cross, for this and other actions during the battle. By the end of the days fighting the regiment's stock of ammunition was running out.

By 22 September, XXX Corps had advanced close enough to Arnhem for their artillery to participate in the battle. But it was the 1st Airlanding Regiment's guns that broke up a German attack on the glider pilots positions just after 07:00 that morning. The following days took on the same pattern until the night of 25/26 September, when the remnants of the 1st Airborne Division were withdrawn south of the River Rhine. The gunners fired their remaining ammunition and then disabled the guns, so they could not be used by the Germans. Of the regiment's 372 men who went to Arnhem, 136 were evacuated, 200 were reported missing and thirty-eight were killed.

=== Norway ===
After Arnhem the regiment and division was brought back up to strength, but the war ended before they were ready for further operations. Then in May 1945, the 1st Airborne Division was sent to Norway to disarm and repatriate the German occupation army. Code named Operation Doomsday for their part the 1st Airlanding Light Regiment were sent to Stavanger. In June some men left to join the 53rd (Worcester Yeomanry) Airlanding Light Regiment, part of the 6th Airborne Division. The rest of the regiment returned to England in August and was disbanded on 1 December 1945.

== Notes ==
Footnotes

Citations
