= William Francis Kynaston Thompson =

British soldier and journalist

- Born: 12 November 1909; Greenwich, London
- Died: 6 June 1980 (aged 70)
- Spouse: Rosemary Foster
- Military career
- Allegiance: British
- Branch: Army
- Service years: 1929–1959
- Rank: Brigadier
- Nickname: Sheriff
- Service number: 44179
- Unit: Royal Artillery
- Commands: 1st Airlanding Light Regiment; 61 Light Regiment
- Conflicts: Second World War; Korean War
- Awards: OBE; MBE; Bronze Cross (Netherlands)
- Other work: Journalist

William Francis Kynaston "Sheriff" Thompson OBE (12 November 1909 – 6 June 1980) was a British soldier and journalist. Born in Greenwich, London in 1909 Thompson served in the army for 30 years before becoming the defence correspondent of the Daily Telegraph.

== Early life ==
Thompson was educated at Cheltenham College and then attended the Royal Military Academy, Woolwich before being commissioned into the Royal Artillery in 1929.

Promoted to Lieutenant in 1932, Thompson was posted to India where he served in a mountain artillery battery. It was in India that Thompson developed a love of climbing and also acquired his nickname of Sheriff. Returning to England Thompson was seconded to the Royal Artillery Training Battalion at the Military College of Science and later appointed adjutant at the College with the rank of Captain.

== Second World War ==
In 1940 Thompson was awarded the MBE "in recognition of distinguished services rendered in recent operations" and after various staff appointments by early 1943 he was a temporary Major and second-in-command of 1st Airlanding Light Regiment. In May 1943 the regiment moved to Algeria but did not participate in the Allied invasion of Sicily unlike the infantry components of 1st Airlanding Brigade. During operations in Sicily the divisional artillery commander was killed and the commanding officer of the 1st Airlanding Light Regiment was appointed to the role. As a result, Thompson was promoted to acting (subsequently temporary) Lieutenant colonel and given command of the regiment. Thompson and the regiment landed in Italy in September 1943 and took part in operations in Italy throughout the remainder of 1943 and into January 1944 when the regiment was withdrawn to England.

=== Arnhem ===
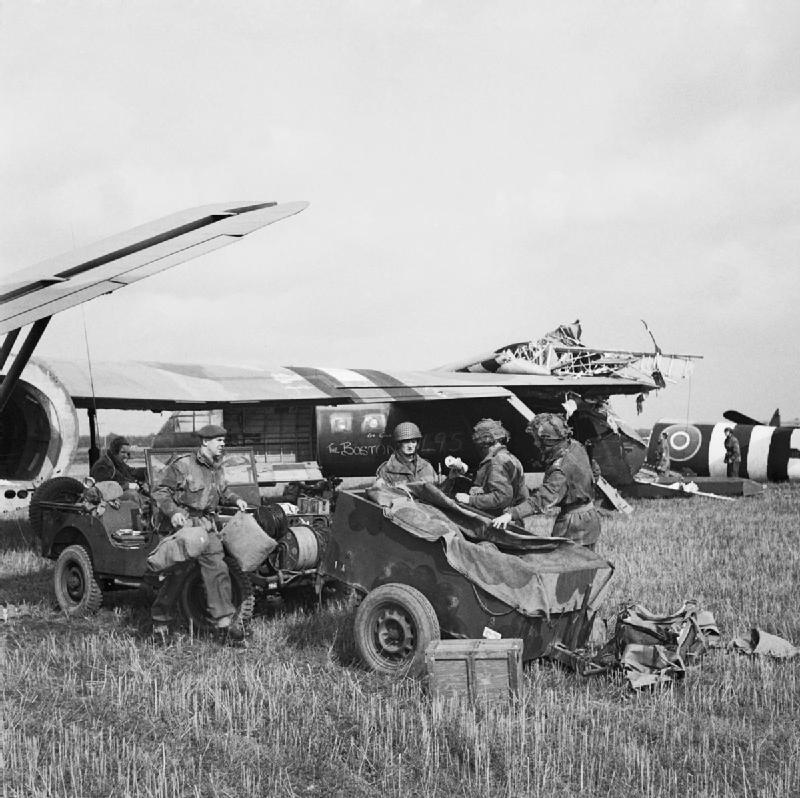
Thompson (left) and members of his HQ loading a jeep after landing by glider at Arnhem

The regiment spent the spring and summer of 1944 training in readiness for the invasion of Europe. In September the regiment took part in Operation Market. Taking off from RAF Fairford on 17 September Thompson, most of his headquarters staff and two of the regiment's three batteries and his men landed by glider at west of Oosterbeek, Arnhem. Shortly after the landing Thompson is recorded as "C.O. "kicking" because there were no targets to fire on, he said we might just as well have come on the next day." The following day with the arrival of the remaining battery the regiment moved to positions around Oosterbeck church to support the attempt by 1st Parachute Brigade to break through to Arnhem bridge. The attack by 1st Parachute Brigade failed and troops from the four infantry battalions started falling back towards Thompson's position. Thompson left his headquarters and went forward to try and get the retreating troops into defensive positions. Thompson organised about 400 men into positions along the road to protect the artillery positions and to block and German advance down the road, placing these men under the command of the most senior officer he could find, Major Robert Cain of the South Staffordshire Regiment, Thompson returned to his headquarters to report to his commanding officer, Brigadier Philip Hicks. Hicks sent Major Richard Lonsdale of 11th Battalion, Parachute Regiment to assist Thompson. Thompson placed Londsale in command of the Parachute Regiment battalions while he took command of the South Staffordshire men in addition to his own regiment and the men of the Glider Pilot Regiment. The whole force was designated "Thompson Force" by 1st Airborne Divisional Headquarters.

Thompson remained in command of this mixed force until 21 September when he was wounded and command of the force passed to Lonsdale. Due to the severity of his wounds Thompson was not able to be evacuated and with the defeat of the airborne forces he was taken prisoner by the Germans and spent the rest of the war in Spangenberg Castle Oflag IX-A/H.

For his actions at Arnhem Queen Wilhelmina of the Netherlands awarded Thompson the Bronze Cross. The citation ran:

On 20th September 1944, West of Arnhem when elements of three Battalions were forced to withdraw from Arnhem under heavy enemy pressure, Lieutenant-Colonel Thompson was commanding the 1st Airlanding Light Regiment, he immediately assumed command of the area, collected every available man and organised the defence of the area. This position, during this period was being heavily shelled and mortared. Lieutenant-Colonel Thompson showed great initiative and determination and the highest degree of personal courage. By his most excellent example and complete lack of self interest, he was entirely responsible for restoring confidence among the troops, and for the ultimate defeat of the enemy attack by tanks and infantry. Less determination and disregard to danger on his part would certainly have altered the sequence of events in this area and the whole course of the battle on the 20th and 21st September."

== Post–Second World War ==
On his release from captivity Thompson held various staff appointments before commanding 61st Light Field Regiment during the latter stages of the Korean War and was made an Officer of the Order of the British Empire in the 1954 Birthday Honours. Thompson was promoted to Brigadier at the end of 1958 and ended his army career as deputy director of staff duties at the War Office retiring in 1959.

== Journalism career ==
After leaving the army Thompson became defence correspondent of the Daily Telegraph, a post he held until 1976. During his period as a journalist he reported from the front line of several wars including the Vietnam War, the Yom Kippur War and the Sino-Indian War of 1962.

Between 1970 and 1978 Thompson was Honorary Colonel of 289 Parachute Troop, Royal Artillery.

== Personal life ==
Thompson married Rosemary Foster in 1937 and they had three children, all of whom survived him.
