= Operation Nordlicht (1944–1945) =

German operation during World War II

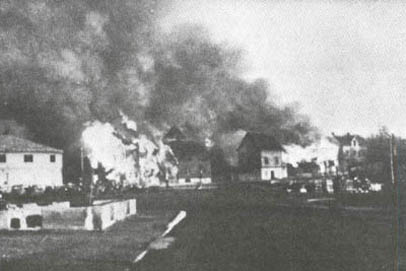
Norwegian town of Kirkenes burning after withdrawal of German forces

Operation Northern Light (German: Unternehmen Nordlicht) was a German operation in October 1944, towards the end of the Second World War. After Finland had made peace with the USSR, the Germans planned to fall back to defense lines across Finnish Lapland (Operation Birke). During the operation, Oberkommando der Wehrmacht gave an order to change from Operation Birke to Operation Nordlicht on 4 October 1944. Instead of evacuating everything and then fortifying the strong defensive positions, the German 20th Mountain Army was to retreat according to a set timetable to a new defense line in Lyngen Municipality in Troms county, Norway. The Germans retreated using scorched-earth tactics and destroyed almost all buildings and all boats in Finnmark, thus denying the enemy any facilities in the area. The same tactics had already been used in Finnish Lapland. The retreat ended on 20 January 1945. A detailed account of 'the Nazis' scorched earth campaign in Norway' by Vincent Hunt includes statements by eyewitnesses, photographs taken at the time and a map of locations and prisoner of war camps.
