= 52nd Infantry Division (Wehrmacht) =

52nd Infantry Division 52nd Field Training Division 52nd Security Division
- 52. Infanterie-Division; 52. Feldausbildungs-Division; 52. Sicherungs-Division
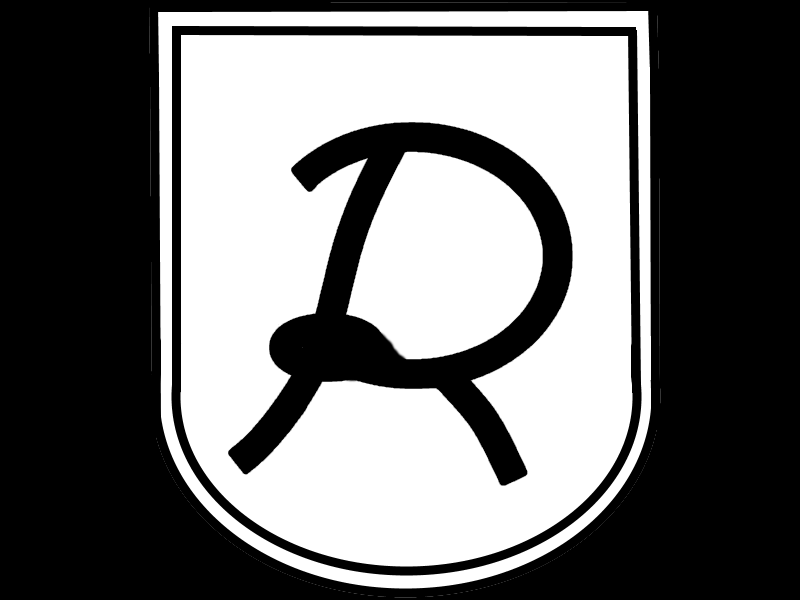
- 52. Infanterie Division Vehicle Insignia
- Active: 26 August 1939 – 8 May 1945
- Country: Nazi Germany
- Branch: Army
- Type: Infantry
- Size: Division
- Engagements: World War II

Commanders
- Notable commanders: Karl-Adolf Hollidt; Hans-Jürgen von Arnim; Lothar Rendulic

The 52nd Infantry Division (German: 52. Infanterie-Division) was an infantry division of the German Heer during World War II, which would become the 52nd Field Training Division (52. Feldausbildungs Division) in December 1943 and then the 52nd Security Division (52. Sicherungs Division) in April 1944.

== Operational history ==
The 52nd Infantry division was formed on 26 August 1939 in Siegen in military district IX. In 1939, the 52nd ID received border security tasks in the Saarpfalz and Trier area on the West Wall.

It participated in operations on the Western Front in May 1940, advancing through Luxembourg and Belgium to Northern France under the 12th Army. Then it fought in France in battles on the Aisne, Champagne and Dijon.

In June 1941, the division was moved to Poland to participate in Operation Barbarossa in which it advanced to Vilnius, Minsk and Moscow, where it was stopped at the Protva river. In October 1943, the Division was reduced to only a combat group after heavy losses in the Battle of Nevel and was dissolved on 1 November 1943.

The division was recreated as 52nd Training Division in December 1943 under command of Generalmajor Albert Newiger.
in April 1944, the division was again renamed as 52nd Security Division still under command of Newiger.
The division was first stationed at Baranavichy and then in Festung Libau (Liepāja in Latvia) in the Courland Pocket where it surrendered in May 1945.

== Organisation ==
Organisation of the division was as follows;

- 52nd Division Headquarters
  - 152nd Protection Company
  - 152nd Supply Company
- 152nd Reconnaissance Company
- 183rd Infantry Regiment (x3 Battalions)
- 187th Infantry Regiment (x3 Battalions)
- 205th Infantry Regiment (x3 Battalions)
- 152nd Artillery Regiment (x3 Light, x1 Heavy Battalions)
- 152nd Antitank Battalion (x3 Batteries)
- 152nd Engineer Battalion
- 152nd Divisional Transportation Battalion
- 152nd Divisional Supply Troops

== Commanders ==
- Generaloberst Karl-Adolf Hollidt (26 Aug – 8 Sept 1939)
- Generaloberst Hans-Jürgen von Arnim (8 Sept 1939 – 5 Oct 1940)
- Generaloberst Lothar Rendulic (10 Oct 1940 – 1 Nov 1942)
- Generalleutnant Rudolf Peschel (1 Nov 1942 – 1 Nov 1943)
- Generalmajor Albert Newinger (10 Dec 1943 – 5 Sept 1944)
- Generalleutnant Albrecht Baron Digeon von Monteton (5 Sept 1944 – 9 May 1945) : POW and executed in February 1946
