= Rudolf Peschel =

German general

- Born: 21 April 1894
- Died: 30 June 1944 (aged 50); Vitebsk, Soviet Union
- Military career
- Allegiance: German Empire; Weimar Republic; Nazi Germany
- Branch: Army
- Service years: 1914–1944
- Rank: Generalleutnant
- Commands: 52nd Infantry Division; 6th Luftwaffe Field Division
- Conflicts: World War II: Vitebsk–Orsha Offensive †
- Awards: Knight's Cross of the Iron Cross

Rudolf Peschel (21 April 1894 – 30 June 1944) was a general in the Wehrmacht of Nazi Germany during World War II. He was a recipient of the Knight's Cross of the Iron Cross. Peschel was killed in action on 30 June 1944 during the Vitebsk–Orsha Offensive.

== Awards and decorations ==
- Knight's Cross of the Iron Cross on 20 January 1944 as Generalleutnant and commander of 6. Luftwaffen-Feld-Division

Military offices
Preceded by Generaloberst Dr. Lothar Rendulic	Commander of 52. Infanterie-Division; 1 November 1942 – 5 November 1943	Succeeded by Generalmajor Albert Newiger
Preceded by Generalleutnant Rüdiger von Heyking	Commander of 6. Luftwaffen-Feld-Division; 5 November 1943 – 30 June 1944	Succeeded by None
