= Gustav von Kessel =

German general

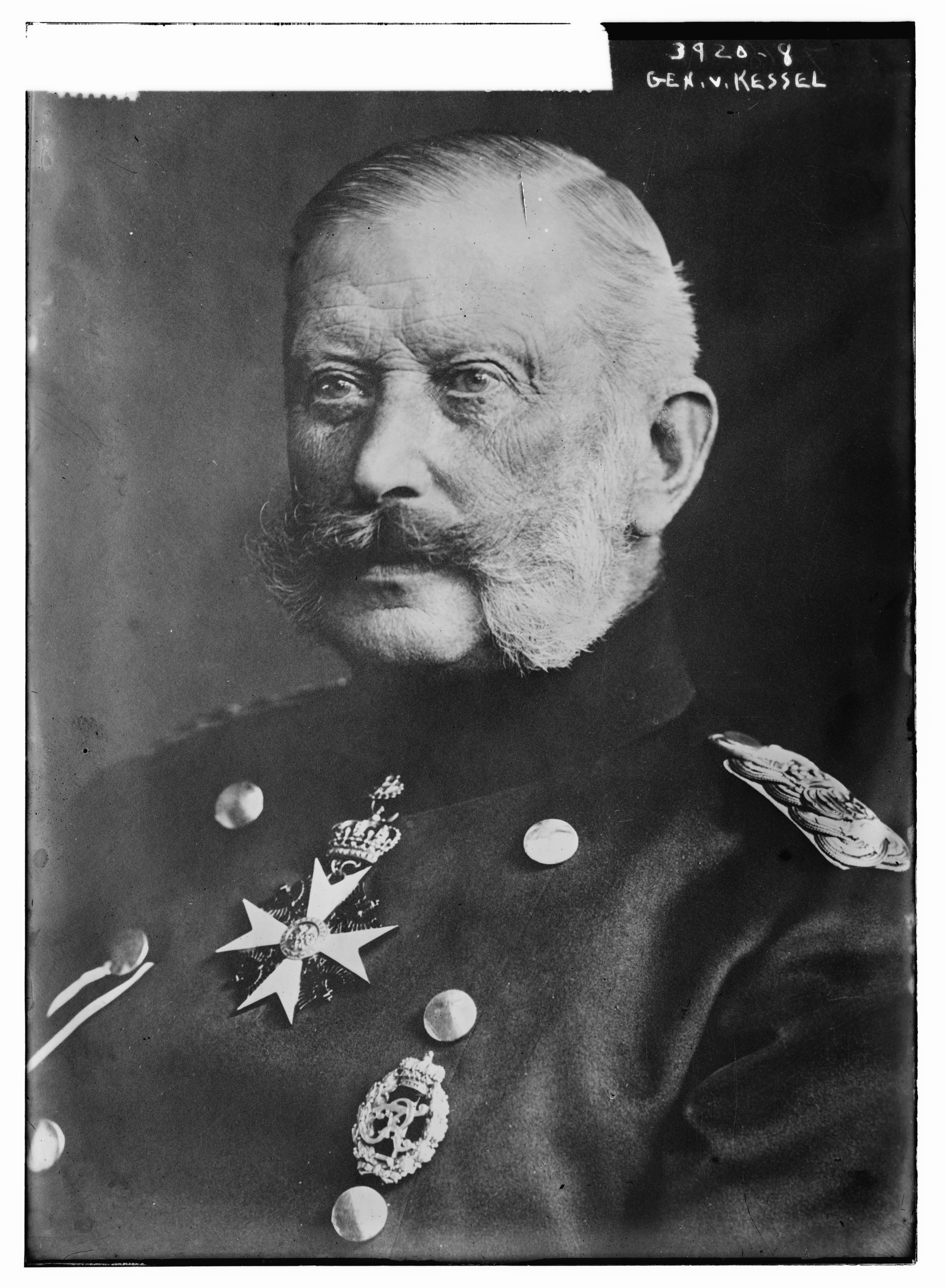
- Born: 6 April 1846; Potsdam, Kingdom of Prussia, German Confederation
- Died: 28 May 1918 (aged 72); Berlin, German Empire
- Military career
- Allegiance: Kingdom of Prussia; German Empire
- Branch: Prussian Army
- Service years: 1864–1918
- Rank: Generaloberst
- Commands: 1st Foot Guards; 2nd Guards Infantry Division; 1st Guards Infantry Division; Guard Corps; Governor of Berlin
- Conflicts: Austro-Prussian War: Battle of Königgrätz; Franco-Prussian War: Battle of Gravelotte; World War I
- Awards: Order of the Black Eagle; Order of the Red Eagle; Royal Victorian Order

Gustav Emil Bernhard Bodo von Kessel (6 April 1846 – 28 May 1918) was a German general who served in the Austro-Prussian War, the Franco-Prussian War and World War I.

== Biography ==
Gustav von Kessel was born on 6 April 1846 in Potsdam, Prussia. He came from a Prussian military family that produced several generals and politicians, including his father Generalmajor Emil von Kessel. He attended various schools, including the Liegnitz Ritter-Akademie, and in 1864 enlisted in the 1st Foot Guards; being commissioned as Sekondeleutnant a year later. He participated in the Austro-Prussian War, being wounded at the Battle of Königgrätz, and the Franco-Prussian War, being wounded at the Battle of Gravelotte.

He was promoted to Premierleutnant in 1872, went to the Prussian Staff College, served a tour in the German General Staff and was made Hauptmann in command of a company in 1878. Later he became adjutant to the crown prince Friedrich Wilhelm, who'd briefly rule as Emperor Frederick III before dying from cancer. With the later's son Wilhelm II ascending to the throne; von Kessel again served the sovereign as adjutant. Continuing to climb the career ladder; he became a Generalmajor in 1896 and three years later a Generalleutnant and Generaladjutant to the Emperor.

As imperial adjutant posts frequently were coupled with positions in the guards; he led his old regiment, the brigade and both the 2nd and 1st guards infantry divisions before eventually receiving command of the Guard Corps in 1902.

From 1909 onwards von Kessel was Military Governor of Berlin and the surrounding province, serving on said post throughout World War I. When the strikes took place from January 1918, Kessel suppressed the strikes using militaries. He died on 28 May 1918, and Alexander von Linsingen was his successor.

== Honours ==
Among his orders and decorations were:

German honours

- Prussia:
  - Knight of the Black Eagle, with Collar
  - Grand Cross of the Red Eagle, with Crown
  - Knight of the Prussian Crown, 1st Class
  - Grand Commander's Cross of the Royal House Order of Hohenzollern
  - Iron Cross (1870), 2nd Class
  - Long Service Award Cross for 25 years
- (Hohenzollern-Sigmaringen) Hohenzollern: Cross of Honour of the Princely House Order of Hohenzollern, 1st Class
- Anhalt: Grand Cross of Albert the Bear
- Baden:
  - Commander of the Zähringer Lion, 2nd Class, 1888
  - Grand Cross of the Order of Berthold the First, 1908
- Bavaria:
  - Knight of St. Hubert
  - Grand Cross of the Military Merit Order
- Mecklenburg:
  - Grand Cross of the Wendish Crown, with Golden Crown
  - Grand Cross of the Griffon
- Oldenburg: Grand Cross of the Order of Duke Peter Friedrich Ludwig
- Württemberg:
  - Grand Cross of the Württemberg Crown
  - Commander of the Friedrich Order, 2nd Class

Foreign honours

- Austria-Hungary:
  - Knight of the Iron Crown, 1st Class, 1888
  - Commander of the Imperial Order of Leopold, 1891; Grand Cross, 1905
  - Commander of the Order of Franz Joseph, with Star, 1892
- Belgium: Grand Cordon of the Order of Leopold
- Bulgaria:
  - Grand Cross of St. Alexander
  - Grand Cross of the Military Merit Order, in Diamonds
- China: Order of the Double Dragon, Grade I Class III
- Denmark: Grand Cross of the Dannebrog, 19 November 1906
- Greece: Grand Cross of the Redeemer
- Italy:
  - Grand Cross of Saints Maurice and Lazarus
  - Grand Cross of the Crown of Italy
- Japan:
  - Grand Cordon of the Order of Meiji
  - Grand Cordon of the Rising Sun
- Montenegro: Grand Cross of the Order of Prince Danilo I
- Netherlands:
  - Commander of the Netherlands Lion
  - Grand Cross of the Order of Orange-Nassau
- Norway: Grand Cross of St. Olav, 15 December 1906
- Ottoman Empire:
  - Order of Osmanieh, 1st Class in Diamonds
  - Order of the Medjidie, 1st Class
- Persia: Order of the Lion and the Sun, 1st Class in Diamonds
- Russia:
  - Knight of St. Alexander Nevsky, in Diamonds
  - Knight of the White Eagle
  - Knight of St. Anna, 1st Class
  - Knight of St. Stanislaus, 1st Class
- Serbia: Officer of the Cross of Takovo
- Siam: Grand Cross of the Crown of Siam
- Spain:
  - Grand Cross of the Military Merit Order
  - Grand Cross of Isabella the Catholic, 7 November 1889
  - Knight of the Order of Charles III
- Sweden: Commander Grand Cross of the Sword, 1905
- United Kingdom: Honorary Grand Cross of the Royal Victorian Order, 18 January 1901

Military appointments

- Regimentschef of the 20th (3rd Brandenburg) Infantry Regiment "Count Tauentzien von Wittenberg"

== See also ==
- List of German colonel generals

== Sources ==
- Rangliste der Königlich Preußischen Armee und des XIII. (Königlich Württembergischen) Armeekorps für 1914 (in German). Berlin: Prussian Ministry of War. 1914.
- "The London Gazette". London. 1 February 1901.
