= Army Group South =

Name of three distinct German Army groups in the Eastern Front of World War II

- German: Heeresgruppe Süd
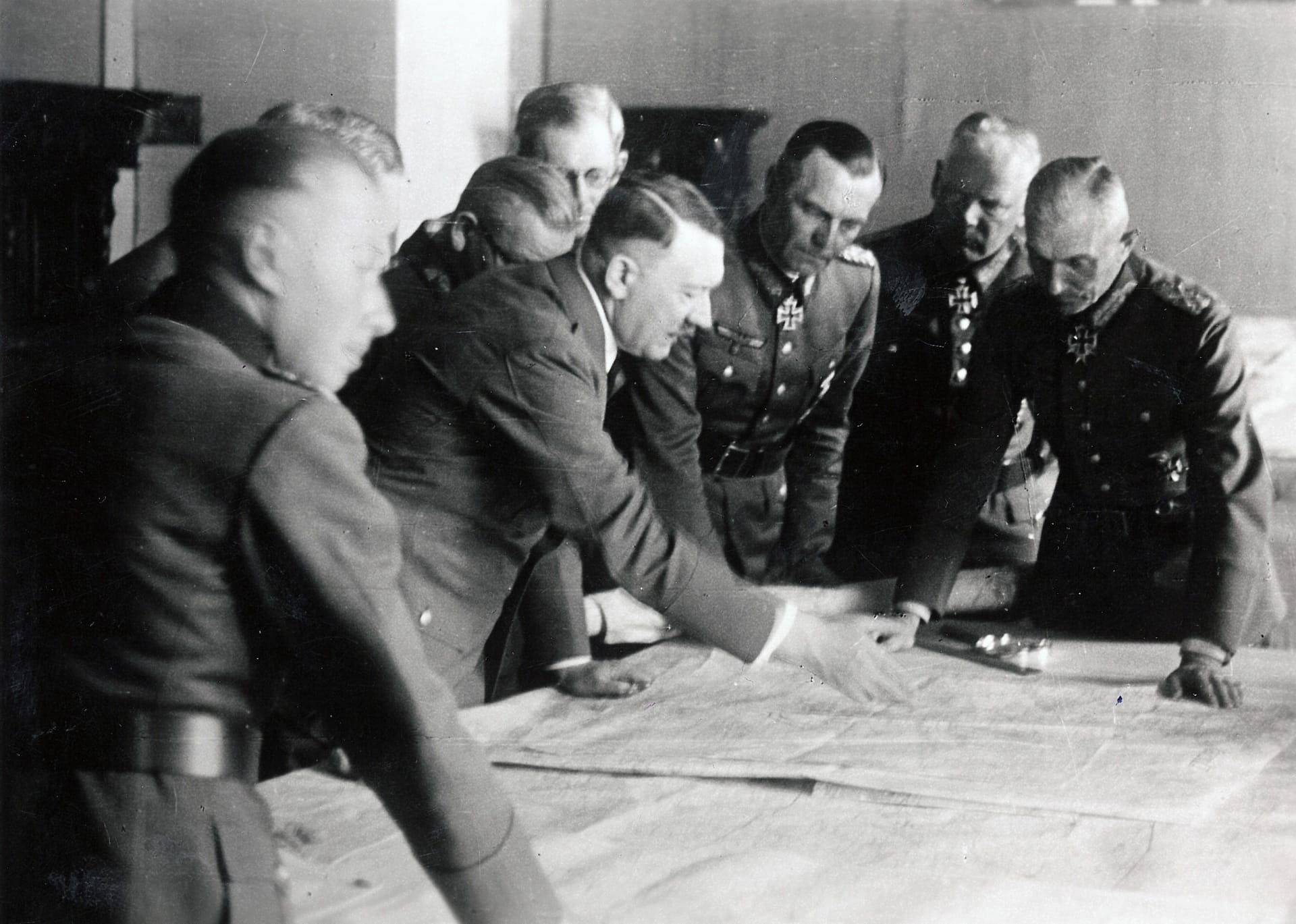
- Briefing at the headquarters of Army Group South at Poltava on 1 June 1942
- Active: 1 September – 26 October 1939; 22 June 1941 – 9 July 1942; 9 February 1943 – 4 April 1944; 23 September 1944 – 1 April 1945
- Country: Nazi Germany
- Branch: Heer ( Wehrmacht)
- Size: On 1 July 1942: 1,210,861 in total
- Engagements: World War II: Invasion of Poland; Operation Barbarossa; Battle of Brody; Operation München; Battle of Uman; Battle of Kiev; First Battle of Kharkov; Crimean Campaign; Battle of Rostov; Second Battle of Kharkov; Operation Blue; Battle of Voronezh; Third Battle of Kharkov; Battle of Kursk; Operation Citadel; Belgorod-Kharkov offensive; Battle of the Dnieper; Battle of Kiev; Dnieper-Carpathian offensive; Zhitomir-Berdichev offensive; Kirovograd offensive; Korsun-Cherkassy pocket; Rovno-Lutsk offensive; Kamenets-Podolsky pocket; Uman–Botoșani offensive; Battle of Debrecen; Budapest offensive; Siege of Budapest; Operation Konrad; Operation Spring Awakening; Vienna offensive

Commanders
- Notable commanders: Gerd von Rundstedt, Fedor von Bock, Walter von Reichenau, Erich von Manstein

Army Group South (German: Heeresgruppe Süd) was the name of one of three German Army Groups during World War II.

It was first used in the 1939 September Campaign, along with Army Group North to invade Poland. In the invasion of Poland, Army Group South was led by Gerd von Rundstedt and his chief of staff Erich von Manstein.

Two years later, Army Group South became one of three army groups into which Germany organised their forces for Operation Barbarossa. Army Group South's principal objective was to capture Soviet Ukraine and its capital Kiev.

In September 1944, Army Group South Ukraine was renamed Army Group South in Eastern Hungary. It fought in Western Hungary until March 1945 and retired to Austria at the end of the Second World War, where it was renamed Army Group Ostmark on 2 April 1945.

== Operation Barbarossa ==
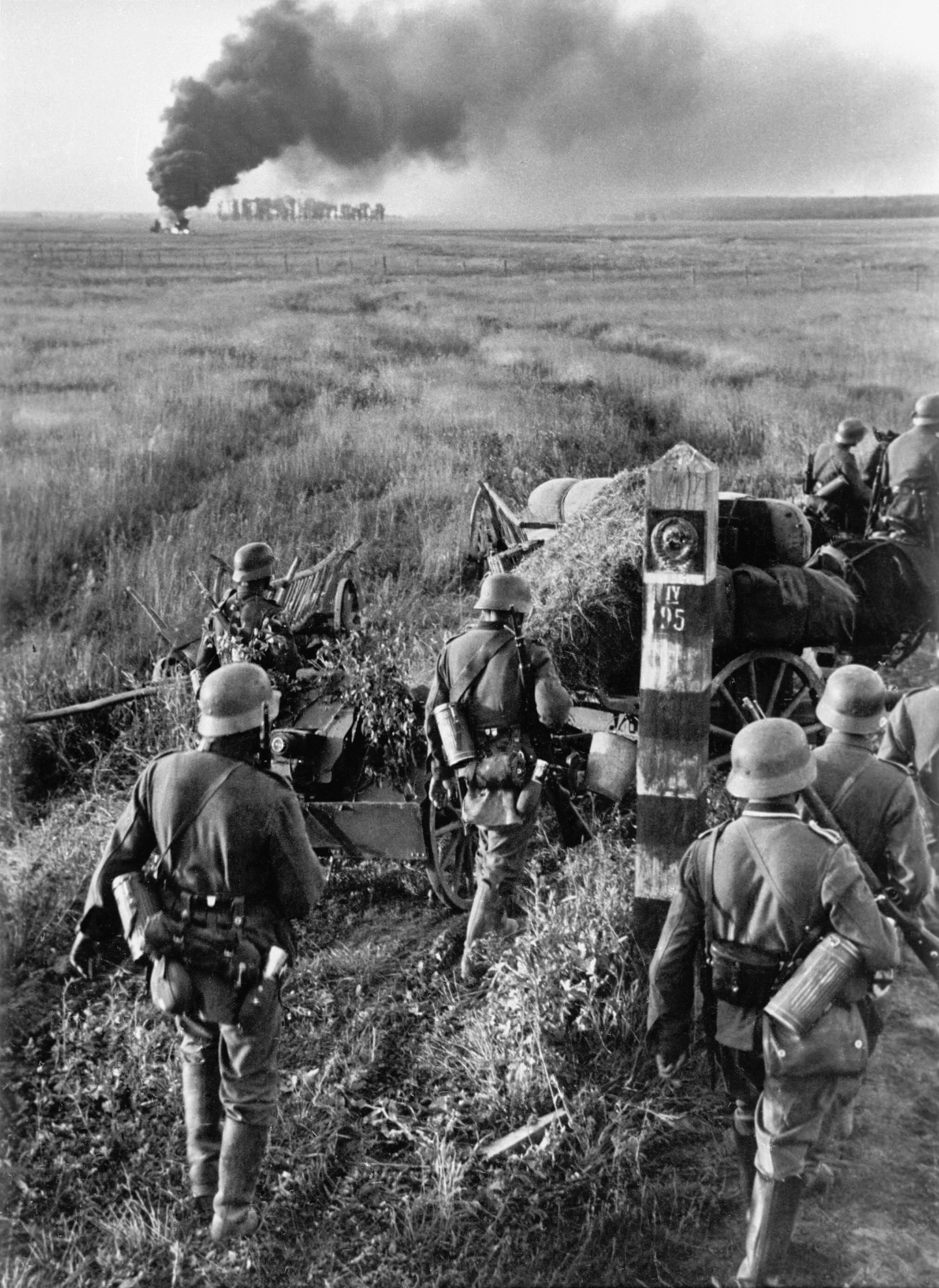
Soldiers of the Army Group South crossing the Soviet border in Ukraine during Operation Barbarossa

Ukraine was a major center of Soviet industry and mining and had the good farmland required for Hitler's plans for Lebensraum ('living space'). Army Group South was to advance up to the Volga River, engaging a part of the Red Army and thus clearing the way for the Army Group North and the Army Group Center on their approach to Leningrad and Moscow respectively.

To carry out these initial tasks its battle order included the First Panzer Group (Gen. Kleist) and the German Sixth (Gen. Reichenau), Seventeenth (Gen. Stülpnagel) and Eleventh Armies (Gen. Schobert), Luftlotte 1 (Keller) and the Romanian Third and Fourth Armies.

== Case Blue ==
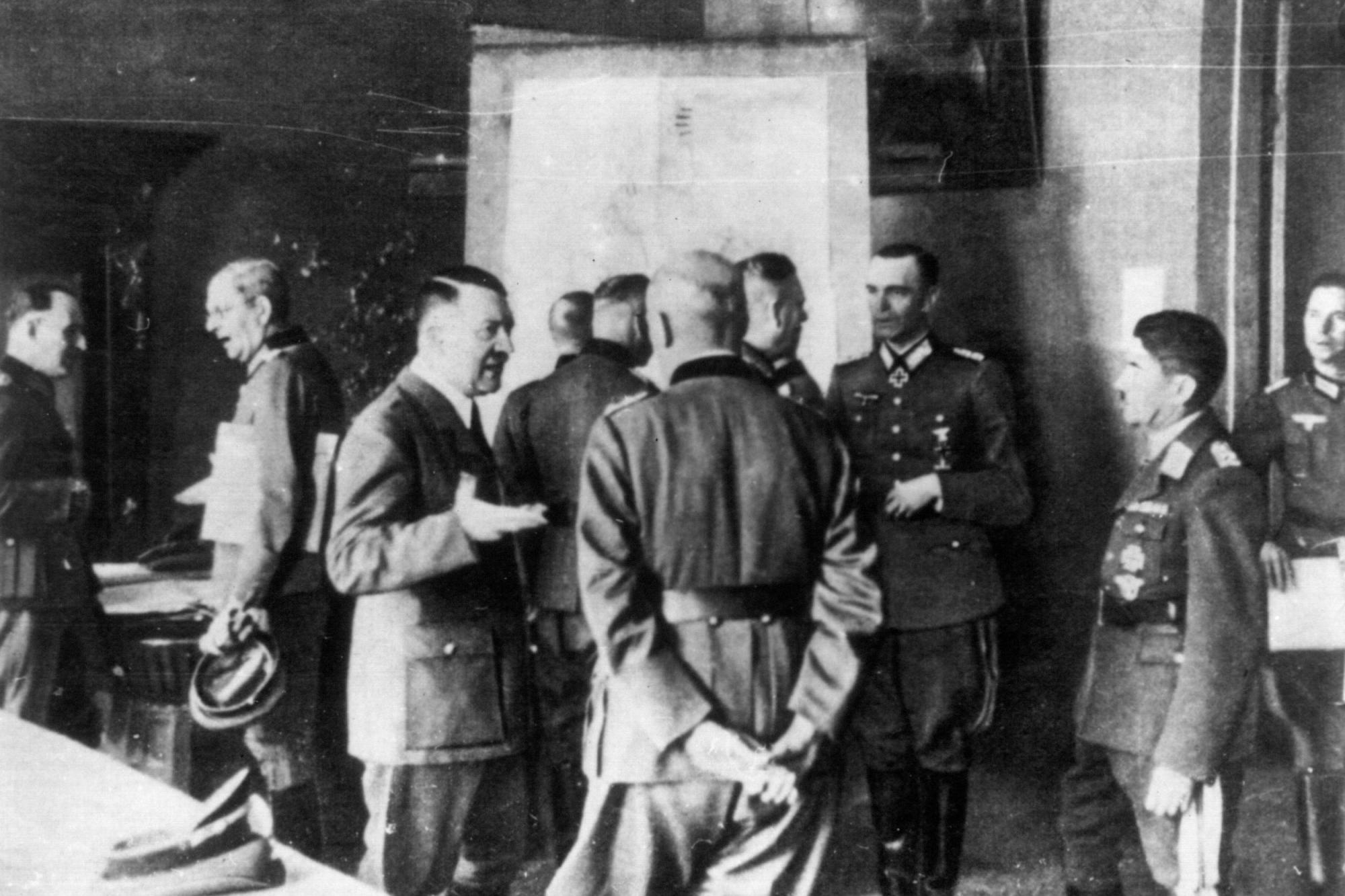
Meeting between Adolf Hitler (left) and officers in the headquarters of Army Group South at Poltava. 1 June 1942

In preparation for Case Blue, the 1942 campaign in southern Russia and the Caucasus, Army Group South was split into two army groups: Army Group A and Army Group B. Army Group A was ordered south to capture the oil fields in the Caucasus.

In February 1943, Army Group Don and the existing Army Group B were combined and re-designated Army Group South. A new Army Group B became a major formation elsewhere. The German Sixth Army, which was destroyed in the Battle of Stalingrad, was re-constituted and later made part of Army Group South in March 1943.

By the end of December 1943, the strength of Army Group South had been reduced to 328,397 German soldiers, joined by another 109,816 allied soldiers and non-German volunteer troops.

On 4 April 1944, Army Group South was re-designated Army Group North Ukraine. Army Group North Ukraine existed from 4 April to 28 September.

In September 1944, Army Group South Ukraine was re-designated Army Group South. At the end of World War II in Europe, Army Group South was again renamed; as Army Group Ostmark, the remnants of Army Group South ended the war fighting in and around Austria and Protectorate of Bohemia and Moravia. Army Group Ostmark was one of the last major German military formations to surrender to the Allies.

== Order of battle for Army Group South, October 1944 ==
| Army Group | Army | Corps | Division | Remarks |
|---|---|---|---|---|
| South Gen Friessner | German; Sixth Army; Gen Fretter-Pico | IV Panzer Corps; LtGen Kleeman | 24th Panzer Division | |
| South Gen Friessner | German; Sixth Army; Gen Fretter-Pico | LXXII Army Corps; LtGen Schmidt | 76th Infantry Division | |
| South Gen Friessner | German; Sixth Army; Gen Fretter-Pico | Hungarian; VII Army Corps; MajGen Vörös | Hungarian; 8th Reserve Division | |
| South Gen Friessner | German; Sixth Army; Gen Fretter-Pico | Hungarian; VII Army Corps; MajGen Vörös | Hungarian; 12th Reserve Division | |
| South Gen Friessner | German; Sixth Army; Gen Fretter-Pico | III Panzer Corps; LtGen Breith | 1st Panzer Division | |
| South Gen Friessner | German; Sixth Army; Gen Fretter-Pico | III Panzer Corps; LtGen Breith | 13th Panzer Division | |
| South Gen Friessner | German; Sixth Army; Gen Fretter-Pico | III Panzer Corps; LtGen Breith | 23rd Panzer Division | |
| South Gen Friessner | German; Sixth Army; Gen Fretter-Pico | III Panzer Corps; LtGen Breith | Feldherrnhalle; Panzergrenadier Division | |
| South Gen Friessner | German; Sixth Army; Gen Fretter-Pico | III Panzer Corps; LtGen Breith | 22nd SS Cavalry Division; Maria Theresa | |
| South Gen Friessner | German; Sixth Army; Gen Fretter-Pico | III Panzer Corps; LtGen Breith | 46th Infantry Division | |
| South Gen Friessner | German; Sixth Army; Gen Fretter-Pico | III Panzer Corps; LtGen Breith | 503rd Heavy Tank Battalion | |
| South Gen Friessner | German; Eighth Army; Gen Wöhler | German; XVII Army Corps; LtGen Kreysing | German; 8th 8th Jäger Division | |
| South Gen Friessner | German; Eighth Army; Gen Wöhler | German; XVII Army Corps; LtGen Kreysing | Hungarian; 27th Infantry Division | |
| South Gen Friessner | German; Eighth Army; Gen Wöhler | German; XVII Army Corps; LtGen Kreysing | Hungarian; 9th Frontier Brigade | |
| South Gen Friessner | German; Eighth Army; Gen Wöhler | Hungarian; IX Army Corps; BrigGen Kovács | German; 3rd Mountain Division | |
| South Gen Friessner | German; Eighth Army; Gen Wöhler | Hungarian; IX Army Corps; BrigGen Kovács | Hungarian; 2nd Replacement Division | |
| South Gen Friessner | German; Eighth Army; Gen Wöhler | German; XXIX Army Corps; LtGen Röpke | German; 8th SS Cavalry Division; Florian Geyer | |
| South Gen Friessner | German; Eighth Army; Gen Wöhler | German; XXIX Army Corps; LtGen Röpke | German; 4th Mountain Division | |
| South Gen Friessner | Hungarian; Second Army; LtGen von Dalnoki (Attached to German; Sixth Army) | Hungarian; II Army Corps; MajGen Kiss | Hungarian; 2nd Armored Division | |
| South Gen Friessner | Hungarian; Second Army; LtGen von Dalnoki (Attached to German; Sixth Army) | Hungarian; II Army Corps; MajGen Kiss | Hungarian; 25th Infantry Division | |
| South Gen Friessner | Hungarian; Second Army; LtGen von Dalnoki (Attached to German; Sixth Army) | Hungarian; II Army Corps; MajGen Kiss | German; 15th Infantry Division | |
| South Gen Friessner | Hungarian; Second Army; LtGen von Dalnoki (Attached to German; Sixth Army) | Hungarian; Group Finta; BrigGen Finta | Hungarian; 7th Replacement Division | |
| South Gen Friessner | Hungarian; Second Army; LtGen von Dalnoki (Attached to German; Sixth Army) | Hungarian; Group Finta; BrigGen Finta | Hungarian; 1st Replacement; Mountain Brigade | |
| South Gen Friessner | Hungarian; Second Army; LtGen von Dalnoki (Attached to German; Sixth Army) | Hungarian; Group Finta; BrigGen Finta | Hungarian; 2nd Replacement; Mountain Brigade | |
| South Gen Friessner | Hungarian; Second Army; LtGen von Dalnoki (Attached to German; Sixth Army) | Army Reserve; LtGen von Dalnoki | Hungarian; 9th Replacement Division | |
| South Gen Friessner | Hungarian; Third Army; LtGen Heszlényi | Hungarian; VIII Army Corps; MajGen Lengyel | Hungarian; 23rd Reserve Division | |
| South Gen Friessner | Hungarian; Third Army; LtGen Heszlényi | Hungarian; VIII Army Corps; MajGen Lengyel | Hungarian; 5th Replacement Division | |
| South Gen Friessner | Hungarian; Third Army; LtGen Heszlényi | Hungarian; VIII Army Corps; MajGen Lengyel | Hungarian; 8th Replacement Division | |
| South Gen Friessner | Hungarian; Third Army; LtGen Heszlényi | Hungarian; VIII Army Corps; MajGen Lengyel | Hungarian; 1st Armored Division | |
| South Gen Friessner | Hungarian; Third Army; LtGen Heszlényi | German; LVII Panzer Corps; LtGen Kirchner | 4th SS; Panzergrenadier Division | |
| South Gen Friessner | Hungarian; Third Army; LtGen Heszlényi | German; LVII Panzer Corps; LtGen Kirchner | Hungarian; 20th Infantry Division | |
| South Gen Friessner | Hungarian; Third Army; LtGen Heszlényi | German; LVII Panzer Corps; LtGen Kirchner | Hungarian; 1st Cavalry Division | |
| South Gen Friessner | Hungarian; Third Army; LtGen Heszlényi | Army Reserve; LtGen Heszlényi | Hungarian; Szent László; Infantry Division | |

== Commanders ==
| No. | Portrait | Commander | Took office | Left office | Time in office |
|---|---|---|---|---|---|
| 1 | Gerd von Rundstedt | Generalfeldmarschall; Gerd von Rundstedt (1875–1953) | 1 September 1939 | 26 October 1939 | 55 days |
| (1) | Gerd von Rundstedt | Generalfeldmarschall; Gerd von Rundstedt (1875–1953) | 22 June 1941 | 1 December 1941 | 162 days |
| 2 | Walter von Reichenau | Generalfeldmarschall; Walter von Reichenau (1884–1942) | 1 December 1941 | 12 January 1942 † | 42 days |
| 3 | Fedor von Bock | Generalfeldmarschall; Fedor von Bock (1880–1945) | 12 January 1942 | 9 July 1942 | 178 days |
| 4 | Maximilian von Weichs | Generalfeldmarschall; Maximilian von Weichs (1881–1954) | 9 July 1942 | 12 February 1943 | 218 days |
| 5 | Erich von Manstein | Generalfeldmarschall; Erich von Manstein (1887–1973) | 12 February 1943 | 2 April 1944 | 1 year, 50 days |
| 6 | Johannes Frießner | Generaloberst; Johannes Frießner (1892–1971) | 23 September 1944 | 28 December 1944 | 96 days |
| 7 | Otto Wöhler | General der Infanterie; Otto Wöhler (1894–1987) | 28 December 1944 | 6 April 1945 | 99 days |
| 8 | Lothar Rendulic | Generaloberst; Lothar Rendulic (1887–1971) | 7 April 1945 | 30 April 1945 | 23 days |

== See also ==
- Army Group Centre
- Army Group North
