= Operation Birke =

German operation in Finnish Lapland during World War II

Operation Birke (Operation Birch) was a German operation late in World War II in Finnish Lapland to protect access to nickel.

== Background ==
Finnish attempts to find an acceptable exit from the Continuation War in spring 1944 alarmed the Germans, who had sizable stores in Northern Finland. In April 1944, the Germans started a feverish effort to recon and construct defensive positions against possible advances from the south.

== Plan ==
The name Birke was assigned for the operation on 9 April 1944. Its primary task was to provide protection to the then vital nickel mining operations at Petsamo (now Pechenga, Russia). Orders for the operation were prepared meticulously in extreme detail. It consisted of several phases, the first of which would be triggered by the code phrase "Birke anschlagen" (mark the birch for felling), would consist of evacuation of military stores and preparation for later phases. The second phase, which would be keyed to the code phrase "Birke fällen" (fell the birch), would consist of the actual military withdrawal to the first fortified position by using a scorched-earth policy. The final planned phase, keyed to the code phrase "Birke zerkleinern" (crush the birch), would send German units towards strong positions around Rovaniemi while a delaying action would be fought.

== Operation ==
The first phase of the operation was started on 3 September 1944 after the Finns had informed the Germans of their intentions. Though the plan had called for two weeks for evacuations before the second phase, the Germans pressed ahead and started the second phase of the operation early on 4 September. 20th Mountain Army managed to evacuate sizeable amount of the war material and get the withdrawal towards Norway well underway under the Operation Birke.

== Results ==
Since the existing German stocks of nickel were deemed sufficient and new deposits had been located in Austria, the importance of holding Petsamo region or Finnish Lapland decreased considerably. At the same time, the logistical and military difficulties of defending Northern Finland were realised. Those factors made it possible for the Germans on 4 October 1944 to gain Hitler's approval for moving from Operation Birke to Operation Nordlicht (Operation Northern Light) and abandon Northern Finland and fortify to Lyngen Municipality in Troms county, Norway.

== See also ==
- Lapland War
- Petsamo-Kirkenes Operation
- Operation Nordlicht (Northern Light)

== Bibliography ==
- Ahto, Sampo (1980). Aseveljet vastakkain - Lapin sota 1944–1945 [Brothers in Arms against each other - Lapland War 1944–1945] (in Finnish). Helsinki: Kirjayhtymä. ISBN 951-26-1726-9.
- Lunde, Henrik O. (2011). Finland's War of Choice: The Troubled German-Finnish Alliance in World War II. Newbury: Casemate Publishers. ISBN 978-1-61200-037-4.
