= Fraham =

- Municipality
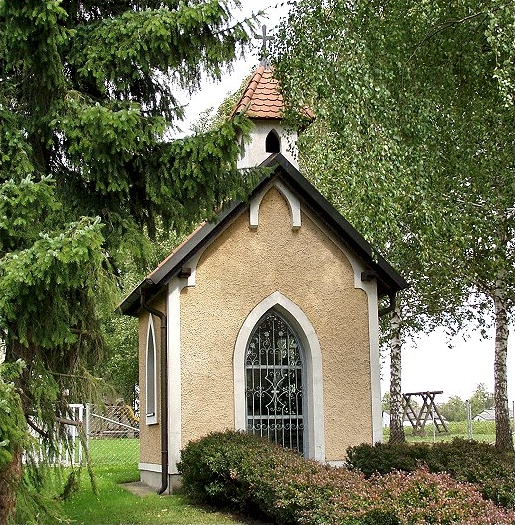
- Chapel in Fraham

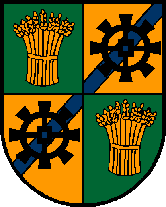
- Coat of arms

- Location within Austria
- Coordinates: 48°0′0″N 14°0′0″E
- Country: Austria
- State: Upper Austria
- District: Eferding

Government
  - Mayor: Harald Schick (SPÖ)

Area
  - Total: 16.95 km^{2} (6.54 sq mi)
- Elevation: 270 m (890 ft)

Population (2018-01-01)
  - Total: 2,395
  - Density: 141.3/km^{2} (366.0/sq mi)
- Time zone: UTC+1 (CET)
  - Summer (DST): UTC+2 (CEST)
- Postal code: 4070
- Area code: 07272
- Vehicle registration: EF
- Website: www.fraham.at

Fraham is a municipality in the district of Eferding in the Austrian state of Upper Austria.

== Geography ==
Fraham lies in the Hausruckviertel region. About 1 percent of the municipality is forest and 14 percent farmland.
