= Army Group Ostmark =

German Army group in the Eastern Front, near the end of World War II

- German: Heeresgruppe Ostmark
- Active: April 1945 – 8 May 1945
- Country: Nazi Germany
- Branch: Heer ( Wehrmacht)
- Type: Army group
- Size: ~450,000 (1 May 1945)

Commanders
- Only commander: Lothar Rendulic

Army Group Ostmark (German: Heeresgruppe Ostmark) was an army group of Nazi Germany. It was formed near the end of World War II and active for just over a month, between 2 April and 8 May 1945. Its sole commander was Lothar Rendulic and its main area of operations was German-controlled Austria.

== History ==
=== Etymology ===
The word Ostmark ("Eastern March"/"Eastern Marches") indicates an eastern frontier region. The term was introduced soon after the Anschluss (the 1938 annexation of Austria by Germany), and designated the former territories of Austria within the new greater German structure.

=== Foundation ===
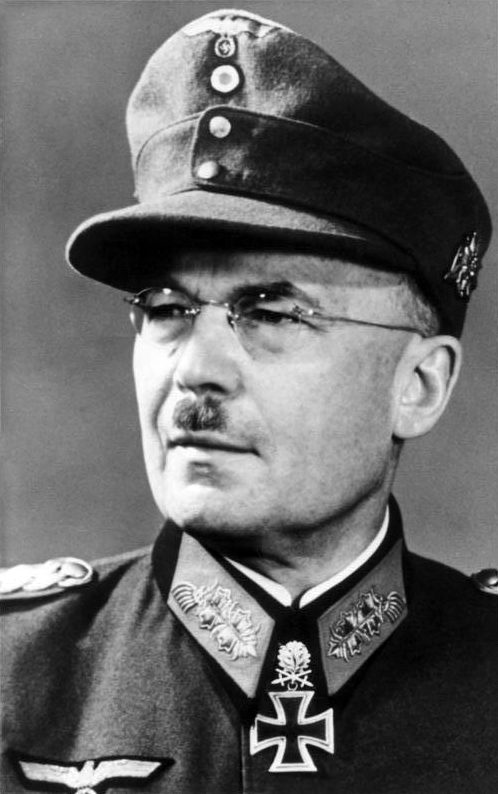
Lothar Rendulic, sole commander of Army Group Ostmark

Army Group Ostmark was formed from the remnants of Army Group South, which had been driven back from the Hungarian plain into Austria. By 7 April 1945, Lothar Rendulic had assumed command of the formation. Its subordinate field armies were the 8th Army, 6th Panzer Army and 6th Army. It was additionally provided with the services of Army Group Signals Regiment 530.

The exact creation/redesignation date of the army group is inconsistent. While Kesselring at the latest redesignated the army group on 24 April, it was still referred to as Army Group South in the final Wehrmacht order of battle on 30 April 1945.

=== Operational history ===
The withdrawing German forces were under continuous pressure by Red Army forces; on 3 April 1945, 4th Ukrainian Front's offensive tasks were expanded to prevent the disentanglement of German forces from advancing Soviet formations, and particularly to deny the German troops the opportunity to escape westwards and surrender to the Western Allies rather than to Soviet troops. On 20 April, the Allied advances into central Germany necessitated the permanent split of German overall army command into a northern sector (led by Dönitz) and a southern sector (led by Kesselring).

By late April, 8th Army (Kreysing), with headquarters in Gaubitsch, was in combat north of Vienna and assigned to hold the sector between the Ernstbrunn Forest (in the Waldviertel) and the Trebitsch-Tabor sector in southern Bohemia. To its south, remnant elements of 6th Panzer Army were distributed along the Danube. On the southern flank, 6th Army was driven out of Graz. Thought experiments on the German side about an Alpine Fortress would have been carried to significant parts by Ostmark forces, but Hitler's refusal to leave Berlin made these ideas superfluous. Western Allied forces were on the advance into southern Austria; 7th US Army captured Innsbruck on 3 May and linked up with elements advancing from the Italian theater at the Brenner Pass on 5 May. Around the turn of April and May 1945, Army Group Ostmark comprised roughly 450,000 military personnel.

On 5 May 1945, Kesselring, already in complicated surrender negotiations with Dwight D. Eisenhower, offered the surrender of army groups Ostmark, E, and Center to the Americans. This was rejected by the American side; the Americans instead insisted that all these forces should simultaneously surrender to opposing Red Army troops as well, which Kesselring at this point was not yet willing to concede.

On 6 May, in the course of the Dönitz government's (Adolf Hitler had committed suicide on 30 April) desperate scramble to secure a regional armistices with the Western Allies, Albert Kesselring received instructions to oversee the regulated surrenders of the Ostmark, South East and Center army group commands to the Western Allies by disentangling them from Soviet forces. This command proved unfulfillable due to the rapid advances of the Red Army. The chaotic circumstances of surrender had cut off various German formations from their lines of communication; OKW was unable to precisely locate Army Group Ostmark and the forces of Oberbefehlshaber Südost. This chaos was furthered by the complicated interactions between Allied interests and the nascent Austrian resistance, as well as the role of Austrian-born Wehrmacht commanders. Southeastern supreme commander Alexander Löhr attempted to win favor (and the support of his troops) for a defensive holding action by his remnant troops against Soviet and Yugoslav forces on the Austrian frontier, to secure postwar Austria's government as non-communist.

After the Dönitz government agreed at Reims to an overall German surrender on 7 May 1945 (to be effective midnight 8/9 May), the army groups still engaged with Soviet forces were instructed to fight their way westwards as far as possible to reach American lines in order to avoid Soviet captivity. Leaderless forces from Army Group Ostmark fled westwards in small groups, attempting to cover the remaining distance to Western Allied lines, which was in all cases more than 100 kilometers. Unfounded rumors that the Western Allies were preparing an immediate rearmament and reorganization of the Wehrmacht for a Western Allied attack against Soviet forces spurred on refugees and raised morale.
