= Karl-Adolf Hollidt =

German Nazi army commander (1891-1985)

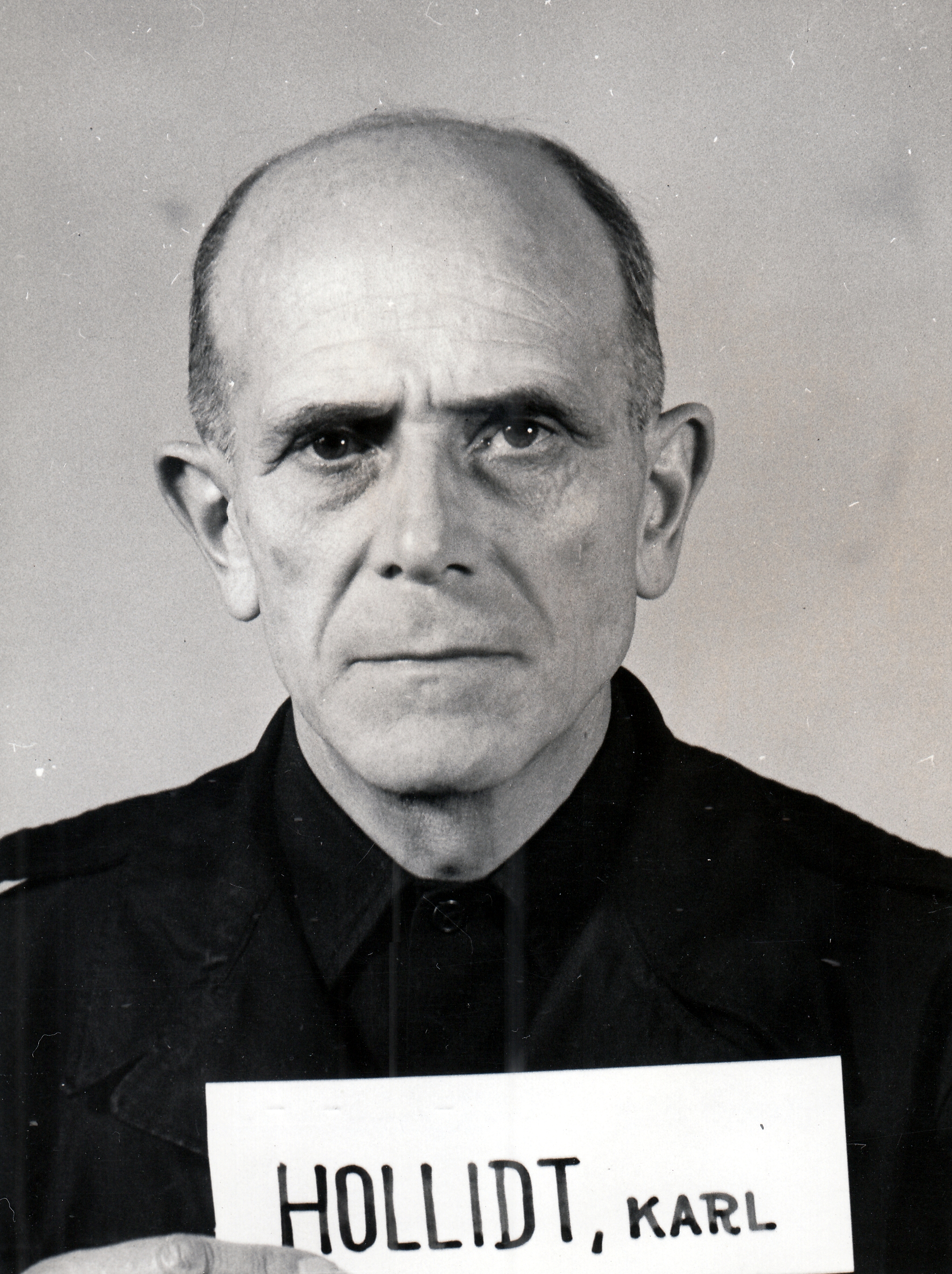
- Karl-Adolf Hollidt at the Nuremberg Trials
- Born: 25 April 1891; Speyer, German Empire
- Died: 22 May 1985 (aged 94); Siegen, West Germany
- Military career
- Allegiance: German Empire; Weimar Republic; Nazi Germany
- Branch: Nazi Germany
- Service years: 1909–1945
- Rank: Generaloberst
- Commands: 6th Army
- Conflicts: World War I; World War II
- Awards: Knight's Cross of the Iron Cross with Oak Leaves

Karl-Adolf Hollidt (25 April 1891 – 22 May 1985) was a German army commander in World War II who was subsequently convicted of war crimes. He was a general (Generaloberst) in the Wehrmacht of Nazi Germany who commanded the 6th Army.

== Career ==
Hollidt enlisted in the German Army in 1909. During World War I, Hollidt served on the Western Front and was awarded the Iron Cross 2nd and 1st Class. He remained in the Reichswehr (the armed forces of the Weimar Republic). Beginning in 1935, he served on the General Staff and as a chief-of-staff of an army corps in the Wehrmacht.

At the beginning of World War II, Hollidt served as commander of the 52nd Infantry Division. From 1 November 1939, he served as a Chief-of-Staff with Commander-in-Chief Ost, General Johannes Blaskowitz. From October 1940 he served as the commander of the 50th Infantry Division, participating in the German invasion of Greece. Promoted to the rank of general, Hollidt commanded XVII Army Corps, which was planned to take part in Operation Winter Storm, an attempt to relieve the 6th Army encircled at Stalingrad. After the surrender of the 6th Army, it was reconstituted in March 1943 and Hollidt was given its command. He was promoted to Generaloberst (colonel general) on 1 September 1943. In 1944, his 6th Army suffered severe losses during its retreat from the Dnieper. Hollidt was dismissed from his command and put into reserve.

== Trial and conviction ==
In 1945, Hollidt was taken prisoner by US forces. At the High Command Trial held at Nuremberg, he was convicted of the unlawful use of prisoners of war and of the deportation and enslavement of civilians. He was sentenced to five years imprisonment, and was released on good time credit on 21 December 1949. He died in 1985.

== Awards ==
- Iron Cross (1914) 2nd Class (9 September 1914) & 1st Class (18 October 1916)
- Clasp to the Iron Cross (1939) 2nd Class (30 May 1940) & 1st Class (7 June 1940)
- Knight's Cross of the Iron Cross with Oak Leaves
  - Knight's Cross on 8 September 1941 as commander of the 50th Infantry Division
  - 239th Oak Leaves on 17 May 1943 as commander of 6th Army
