= Lothar Rendulic =

Austrian general (1887–1971)

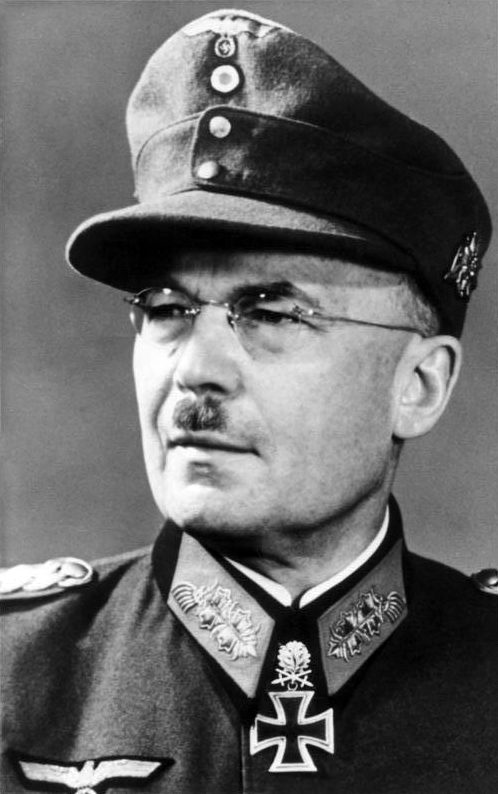
- Born: 23 October 1887; Wiener Neustadt, Austria-Hungary
- Died: 17 January 1971 (aged 83); Fraham, Eferding, Austria
- Military career
- Allegiance: Austria-Hungary; First Austrian Republic; Federal State of Austria; Nazi Germany
- Branch: Austro-Hungarian Army; Austrian Armed Forces; German Army
- Service years: 1910–1938; 1938–1945
- Rank: Oberst; Generaloberst
- Commands: 14th Infantry Division; 52nd Infantry Division; XXXV Corps; 2nd Panzer Army; 20th Mountain Army; Army Group Courland; Army Group North; Army Group Ostmark
- Conflicts: World War I; World War II; Lapland War
- Awards: Knight's Cross of the Iron Cross with Oak Leaves and Swords

Lothar Rendulic (Croatian: Rendulić; 23 October 1887 – 17 January 1971) was an Austrian army group commander and war criminal in the Wehrmacht during World War II.

Rendulic was tried at the Subsequent Nuremberg Trials in 1948. Though acquitted of deliberate scorched earth tactics in Finland during the Lapland War, he was convicted of killing hostages in Yugoslavia at the Hostages Trial and imprisoned. After his release in 1951 he took up writing.

== Early life and career ==
Rendulic was born in 1887 in Austria into a military family of Croatian origin (Rendulić). He studied law and political science at universities in Vienna and Lausanne; in 1907, he was admitted to the Theresian Military Academy and commissioned as an officer into the Austro-Hungarian Army in 1910. He served during World War I from 1914 to 1918. Returning to the University of Vienna, Rendulic obtained his doctorate in law in 1920. He joined the newly formed Austrian Armed Forces and in 1932 joined the banned Austrian Nazi Party. From 1934, Rendulic served as a military attaché to France and the United Kingdom. In 1936 he was put on the "temporary inactive list" because of his early membership in the Nazi Party.

== World War II ==
Rendulic was called to the German Army, as part of the Wehrmacht, in 1938, after the annexation of Austria to Germany. He commanded the 14th Infantry Division (23 June – 10 October 1940); the 52nd Infantry Division (1940–1942); and the XXXV Corps (1942–1943), with which he participated in the Battle of Kursk. From 1943 to 1944, Rendulic commanded the 2nd Panzer Army during World War II in Yugoslavia. Early in 1944, Adolf Hitler ordered Rendulic to devise a plan to capture Yugoslav partisan leader Josip Broz Tito. In the resultant raid on Drvar on 25 May 1944, German paratroopers stormed partisan Supreme Headquarters in Drvar (western Bosnia) looking for Tito but ultimately failed to capture him, suffering heavy casualties.

From June 1944, Rendulic commanded the 20th Mountain Army and all German troops stationed in Finland and Norway. Following the war, Rendulic was accused of ordering the destruction of the Finnish town of Rovaniemi in October 1944, allegedly as revenge against the Finns for making a separate peace with the Soviet Union. In 1945, Rendulic served as the commander-in-chief of Army Group Courland cut off in the Courland Pocket on the Eastern Front; Army Group North in Northern Germany; and Army Group Ostmark, in Austria and Czechoslovakia. While commanding Army Group North and trying to prevent the loss of East Prussia, he issued orders that any unwounded soldier found in a rear area outside his unit area was to receive a court-martial on the spot and be shot. Also, a battalion commander was shot for retreating his unit.

On 7 May 1945, following the Soviet Prague Offensive, Lothar Rendulic surrendered Army Group Ostmark to the 71st Infantry Division of the U.S. Army in Austria.

== War crimes trial ==
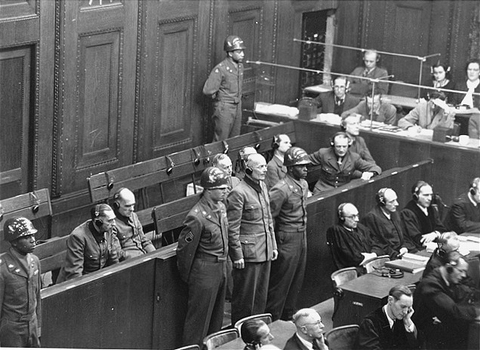
Lothar Rendulic is sentenced in the Hostage Case USHMM No 16808

After his surrender, Lothar Rendulic was interned and tried in the Hostages Trial at Nuremberg, because of his involvement in the Wehrmacht's reprisals against civilians in Yugoslavia and the scorched earth policy in Lapland. On 19 February 1948 he was found guilty of war crimes and sentenced to twenty years in prison, although he was cleared of charges concerning the scorching of Lapland. Based upon the recommendations of the Peck Panel, this sentence was later reduced to ten years, and on 1 February 1951 Rendulic was released from the military prison in Landsberg am Lech in Bavaria.

== Later life ==
After his release, he worked as an author and was involved in local politics in Seewalchen am Attersee, in the Salzkammergut region. He died at Fraham near Eferding on 17 January 1971.

== Awards ==
- Iron Cross (1914) (2nd Class and 1st Class)
  - Clasp to the Iron Cross 2nd Class on 20 September 1939 & 1st Class on 10 October 1939
- German Cross in Gold on 26 December 1941 as Generalmajor and commander of the 52. Infanterie-Division
- Knight's Cross of the Iron Cross with Oak Leaves and Swords
  - Knight's Cross on 6 March 1942 as Generalleutnant and commander of the 52. Infanterie-Division
  - 271st Oak Leaves on 15 August 1943 as General der Infanterie and commanding general of the XXXV. Armeekorps
  - 122nd Swords on 18 January 1945 as Generaloberst and commander-in-chief of the 20. Gebirgsarmee
- Golden Party Badge (19 September 1944)

== Works ==
- Gekämpft, gesiegt, geschlagen. (Fought, victorious, vanquished) Welsermühl Verlag, Wels and Heidelberg, 1952. 384 p.
- Glasenbach - Nürnberg - Landsberg. Ein Soldatenschicksal nach dem Krieg (A soldier's fate after the war), Leopold Stocker Verlag, Graz, 1953. 222 p.
- Die unheimlichen Waffen : Atomraketen über uns. Lenkwaffen, Raketengeschosse, Atombomben (Monstrous weapons: atomic rockets over us. Guided weapons, rockets, atom bombs) 1957
- Weder Krieg noch Frieden. Eine Frage an die Macht. (Neither war nor peace. A question to the powers) Welsermühl Verlag, Munich and Wels, 1961. 250 p.
- Soldat in stürzenden Reichen. (Soldier in falling empires) Damm Verlag, Munich 1965. 483 p.
- Grundlagen militärischer Führung, 1967
- Aus dem Abgrund in die Gegenwart. (From the abyss to the present) Verlag Ernst Ploetz, Wolfsberg, 1969. 259 p.

Military offices
Preceded by Generalleutnant Peter Weyer	Commander of 14th Infantry Division; 15 June 1940 – 6 October 1940	Succeeded by Generalleutnant Friedrich Fürst
Preceded by Generaloberst Hans-Jürgen von Arnim	Commander of 52nd Infantry Division; 10 October 1940 – 1 November 1942	Succeeded by Generalleutnant Rudolf Peschel
Preceded by General der Artillerie Rudolf Kämpfe	Commander of XXXV Army Corps; 1 November 1942 – 5 August 1943	Succeeded by General der Infanterie Friedrich Wiese
Preceded by Generalfeldmarschall Walter Model	Commander of 2nd Panzer Army; 14 August 1943 – 24 June 1944	Succeeded by General der Infanterie Franz Böhme
Preceded by Generaloberst Eduard Dietl	Commander of 20th Mountain Army; 25 June 1944 – 15 January 1945	Succeeded by General der Gebirgstruppen Franz Böhme
Preceded by none	Commander of Army Group Courland; 15 January 1945 – 27 January 1945	Succeeded by Generaloberst Heinrich von Vietinghoff
Preceded by Generalfeldmarschall Ferdinand Schörner	Commander of Army Group North; 27 January 1945 – 12 March 1945	Succeeded by Generaloberst Walter Weiß
Preceded by Generaloberst Heinrich von Vietinghoff	Commander of Army Group Courland; 12 March 1945 – 5 April 1945	Succeeded by General Carl Hilpert
Preceded by General der Infanterie Otto Wöhler	Commander of Army Group South; 6 April 1945 – 30 April 1945	Succeeded by Command renamed Army Group Ostmark 30 April 1945
Preceded by none	Commander of Army Group Ostmark; 30 April 1945 – 7 May 1945	Succeeded by dissolved on 8 May 1945
