= 20th Mountain Army =

- German: 20. Gebirgs-Armee
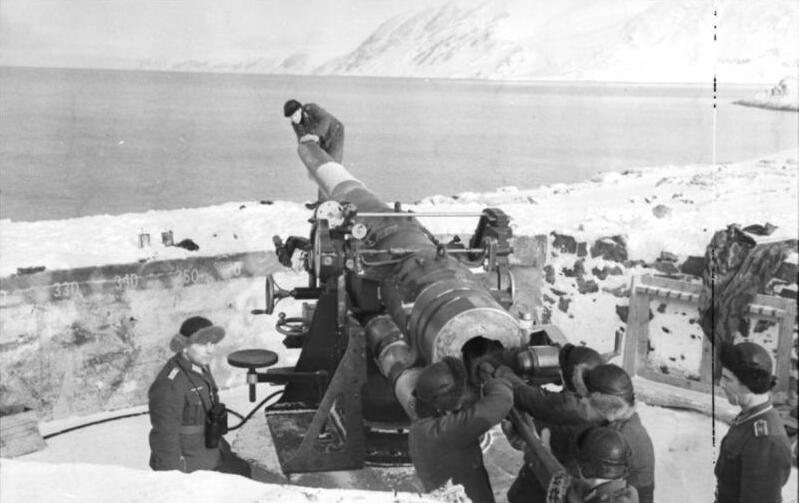
- Men of the 20th Mountain Army at a position on Tanafjord, Norway, 1942
- Active: January 1942–1945
- Country: Nazi Germany
- Allegiance: Nazi Germany
- Branch: German Army
- Size: Field army ~350,000(1945)
- Engagements: World War II: Eastern Front

Commanders
- Notable commanders: Eduard Dietl; Lothar Rendulic

The 20th Mountain Army (German: 20. Gebirgs-Armee), initially known as the Lapland Army (Armee Lappland), was a field army-level military formation of the German Army during World War II.

The 20th Mountain Army was one of the two army echelon headquarters controlling German troops in the far north of Norway and Finland during World War II. It was formed in June 1942 by renaming the Lapland Army command, which had been formed in January. On 18 December 1944, the 20th Mountain Army took over the role of Wehrmachtsbefehlshaber Norwegen from the dissolved Army Norway.

== Commanders ==
=== Commanders-in-chief ===
No.	Portrait	Commander	Took office	Left office	Time in office
1	Eduard Dietl	Generaloberst; Eduard Dietl (1890–1944)	14 January 1942	23 June 1944 †	2 years, 161 days
2	Lothar Rendulic	Generaloberst; Lothar Rendulic (1887–1971)	25 June 1944	21 January 1945	210 days
3	Franz Böhme	General der Gebirgstruppe; Franz Böhme (1885–1947)	21 January 1945	8 May 1945	107 days

=== Chiefs of staff ===
- Generalleutnant Ferdinand Jodl (22 June 1942 – 1 March 1944)
- Generalleutnant Hermann Hölter (1 March 1944 – 8 May 1945)

== Units ==
April 1942:

- 2nd Mountain Division
- 6th Mountain Division
- 7th Mountain Division
- 163rd Infantry Division
- 169th Infantry Division
- 210th Infantry Division
- 6th SS Mountain Division Nord
- Finnish 3rd Division

=== Supporting units ===
- 211th Panzer Battalion
- 741st StuG Battalion
- 742nd StuG Battalion

== See also ==
- Army Norway (Wehrmacht)
