= Battle of Rovaniemi =

Battle in the Lapland War

- Part of the Lapland War of World War II
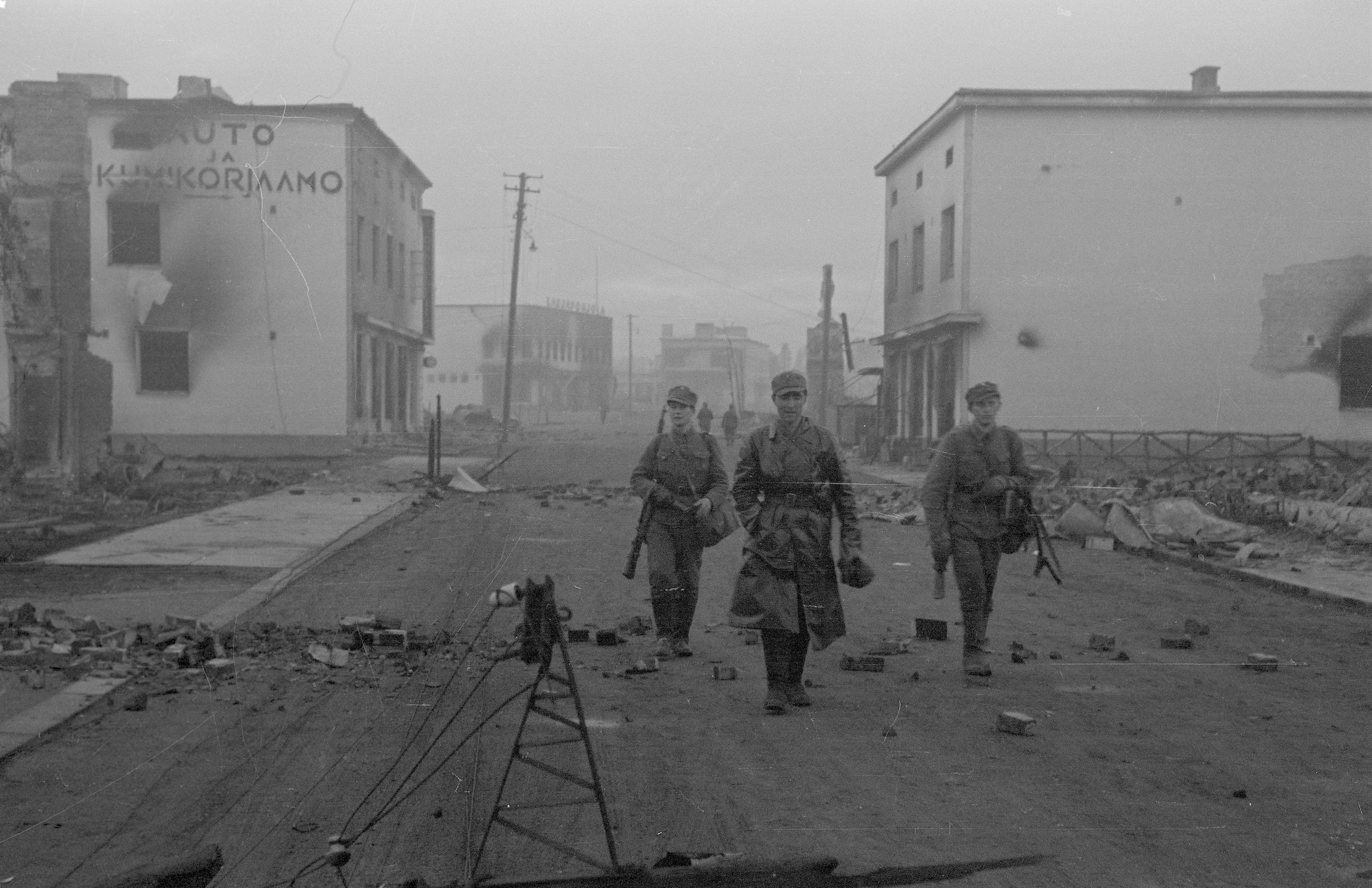
- Finnish troops arriving in scorched Rovaniemi during the Lapland War
Date	October 12–13, 1944
Location	Rovaniemi, Finland
Result	German withdrawal

Belligerents
Germany	Finland

Commanders and leaders
Henrik Saussel	Ruben Lagus

Strength
500 men 3 tanks	1,500 men 20 tanks

Casualties and losses
52 dead 164 wounded 9 missing 1 tank	36 dead 101 wounded 4 missing

The Battle of Rovaniemi was an event during the 1944 Lapland War. The actual fighting between the components of the Finnish Armoured Division and Finnish 3rd Division against the troops of the German Twentieth Mountain Army took place at the vicinity of the town of Rovaniemi. The notoriety of the encounter derives from the near-total destruction of the town.

== Background ==
The town of Rovaniemi was the capital of Lapland, the northernmost province of Finland. During the Second World War it was an important transport hub since it lay on the road to the Petsamo area and the only free port in the north, Liinahamari.

When the Continuation War between Finland and the Soviet Union started in 1941, the Finnish government allowed German troops from the German 20th Mountain Army in Norway to be stationed in Lapland to help defend the long border. The objective of the Germans was to control the nickel mines in Petsamo and to conquer the Russian port of Murmansk, cutting the Soviet Union off from Allied supply convoys. Rovaniemi was the German HQ in Lapland and also the base of Luftflotte 5 of the Luftwaffe.

Relations between the German garrisons and the local populace in Lapland were generally cordial during the war. However, when the Finns signed a separate peace with the Soviet Union, relations soured. The Germans had some 200,000 troops in Finland and they were still at war with the Russians. The Soviet Union demanded that the Finns remove all German troops from their territory in two weeks, which was a logistical impossibility. Rovaniemi was a critical transportation nexus in Lapland through which the sole railroad and several of the main roads passed making controlling it very important to the German evacuation effort.

== Prelude ==
Already on October 1, the Finns moved against the Germans in the Kemi-Tornio region to convince the Russians of their intention to live up to the treaty. Simultaneously, Finnish forces advanced along other roads in northern directions. The Finnish armoured division started its advance north in the direction of Rovaniemi from Ranua. Once the fighting in Tornio region had ended, the Finnish 3rd Division advanced towards Rovaniemi on the road running alongside the Kemijoki river.

Finnish forces advancing along the Kemijoki river were unable to move swiftly enough to engage the Germans, but Finnish forces advancing from Ranua did. The Germans used a preset timetable for determining when ground should be given in order to maximize effectiveness of the evacuation and this called for the German force (218th Mountain Regiment) to delay the Finnish advance. Finnish and German forces clashed several times along the road, first at Ylimaa and later at Kivitaipale, without decisive results.

== Fighting near Rovaniemi ==
Retreating German forces utilized scorched earth tactics, and though initially German General Lothar Rendulic ordered only the public buildings in Rovaniemi to be destroyed, on 13 October 1944 the German army received orders to destroy all the buildings in Rovaniemi, only excluding hospitals and houses where inhabitants were present. While the German rear guard was going about the destruction, an ammunition train in Rovaniemi station exploded and set fire to the wooden houses of the town. The German troops suffered many casualties, mainly from glass splinters. A Finnish commando unit claimed to have blown up the ammunition train and may well have been the primary cause of the town's ruin. The cause was then unknown and generally assumed to be the deliberate intent of Rendulic. During these hostilities 90% of all the buildings in Rovaniemi were destroyed.

On 14 October the first Finnish forces reached the vicinity of Rovaniemi. These consisted of the troops of Jaeger Brigade (part of the Finnish Armored Division) advancing from Ranua. Finnish forces found out that one of the bridges crossing the Kemijoki river was still intact and moved to capture it. The German had failed to blow up the bridge because the ammunition train exploded with enough force that, even though the bridge was 3 km away, it blew the German explosives into the river. Finnish forces reached the bridge while it was intact, but then the German rearguard managed to push Finns off the bridge long enough for them to demolish it. This stranded the Jaeger Brigade on the southern side of the river; there was no other way to the river.

The next Finnish unit to arrive was the 11th Infantry Regiment, advancing along the road on the northern side of the Kemijoki river on 15 October 1944. Its commander decided to encircle the remaining Germans and moved to cut the road leading from Rovaniemi towards Kittilä. Fortunately for the single German battalion (II of 12th SS Mountain Jaeger Regiment), the Finns were low on munitions and unable to support the encircling units which allowed the German battalion to escape nearly unscathed.

== Results ==
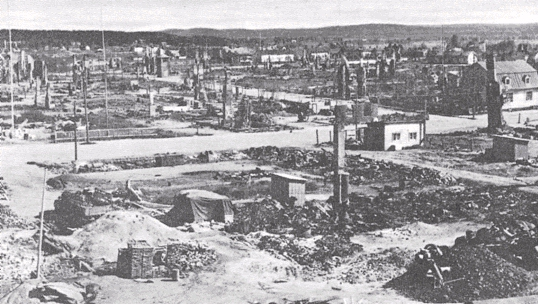
The town of Rovaniemi destroyed by the Germans. In the picture, the reconstruction work has already begun.

The fighting near Rovaniemi achieved very little on either side. The most notable part of the fighting was the devastation inflicted to the town just prior to the fight. With the German rear guard troops still in town, during the controlled destruction of governmental buildings fire quickly spread to the wooden houses despite German attempts to prevent it.

== See also ==
- Lapplandsender
