= Battle of Tornio =

1944 Finnish-German battle

- Part of the Lapland War of World War II
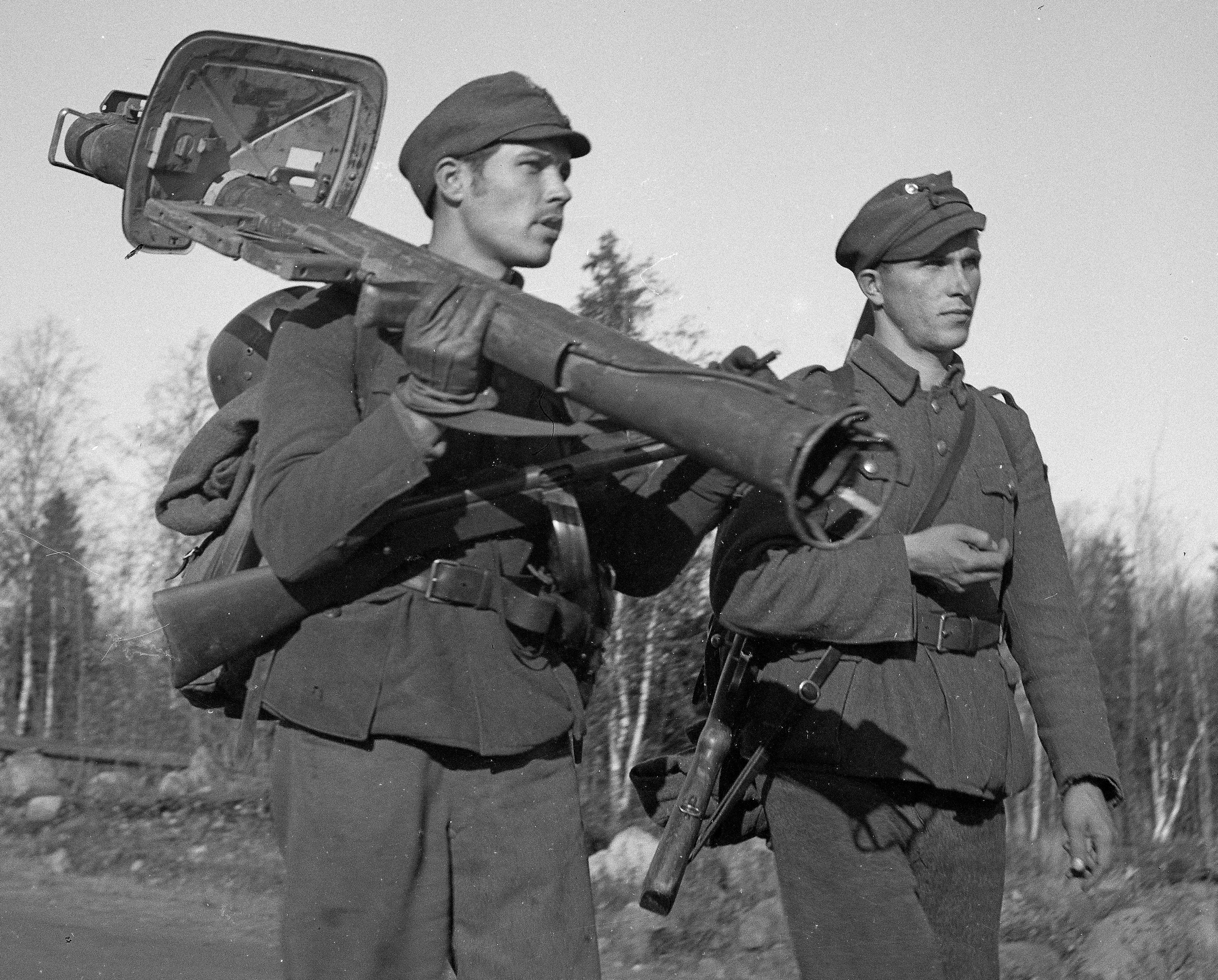
- Finnish Panzerschreck team near Tornio
Date	1–8 October 1944
Location	Kemi-Tornio area, Finnish Lapland
Result	Finnish victory

Belligerents
(Nazi Germany) Germany	Finland

Commanders and leaders
Mathias Kräutler	Hjalmar Siilasvuo

Strength
7,000; 11 tanks & artillery	12,500; 2 gunboats

Casualties and losses
Unknown	375 killed 1,400 wounded 23 captured

The Battle of Tornio (October 1–8, 1944) was the first major engagement between Nazi Germany and Finland in the Lapland War; although hostilities had already begun elsewhere (see Tanne Ost).

== Background ==
Though open fighting had erupted already in mid September at Gogland between the Finnish and German troops the relations between the two sides in northern Finland had remained fairly good. As per earlier planned Operation Birke Germans had been evacuating material and troops to safer positions further north in the Finland. The actual German interest in the Finnish Lapland was in keeping hold of the Petsamo area and its nickel mines. On the other hand, the German and Finnish troops had been fighting together for three years, and many personal friendships had been forged between the two armies. Thus, until now, there had been very few actual hostilities between the German and Finnish troops. Until the battle of Tornio Finnish and German troops had been performing 'autumn maneuvers' in which the pace of the German withdrawal was matched with pace of the following Finnish troops with mutual agreement thus avoiding open conflict between the two sides.

The Finns, however, were forced by their peace agreement with the USSR to forcibly remove German troops from their territory. Thus the invasion of Tornio was planned and executed to surprise the Germans and open a front behind their backs along the Swedish border. Lieutenant-General Siilasvuo was the officer in charge of the operations in Lapland and planned an amphibious assault near Tornio in time with an overland attack towards Kemi; both operations had Oulu as their base. The Finns used three cargo vessels with an armament of single anti-aircraft machine gun in each ship. They had no air or naval support during the 80 mile sail from Oulu to Tornio.

== Initial operations ==
=== German strength ===
German forces at the direction of Kemi (and Tornio) were grouped under Division Kräutler. These were 1st battalion of 139th Mountain Jaeger Brigade (Gebirgsjäger-Brigade 139), 6th Jaeger Battalion (Jäger-Bataillon 6), 6th SS Mountain Reconnaissance Battalion (SS-Gebirgs-Aufklärungs-Abteilung 6), and 6th SS Infantry Battalion (SS-Schützen-Bataillon "Nord" 6). Due to the Finnish pressure from the south only the 6th SS Mountain Reconnaissance Battalion could be moved towards Tornio while the rest were tied down against the advancing Finns.

=== Uprising at Tornio ===
The Finns had managed to get German permission to stage a battalion worth of men known as 'Detachment Pennanen' (fi. Osasto Pennanen) behind their lines in the subterfuge of protecting the key industrial facilities at Kemi. In addition to this force the Finnish civic guard had planned an uprising to take place at border town of Tornio. Major Thure Larjo, utilizing Finnish soldiers at the time on leave at the location and a single company of air defence soldiers, managed to take control of the town of Tornio on the west bank of the Torne (Finnish and Swedish river) and contain the few Germans who were at the site. However the planned attack on the large German supply depot near the railroad station of Tornio on the east bank of the river failed. However the Finns were able to send a train to assist the arriving landing force.

Though the uprising was not as successful as had been hoped for it contributed to the confusion on the German side and also made it easier for the landing force to arrive undetected to the port of Röyttä, the outer port of Tornio. Actions of Detachment Pennanen at Kemi, namely capturing the port of Ajos, further mislead the initial German response to the landing operation into believing that the Finns would concentrate on Kemi instead of Tornio.

=== Landing at Röyttä ===
The first elements of the Finnish 11th Infantry Regiment (JR 11) landed unopposed at the port of Röyttä at 07:45 on 1 October and were met by a train that started transporting troops closer to the town. Lieutenant Colonel Halsti had planned to move his forces swiftly towards Kemi to secure the important bridges across the Kemi river – however after learning from the Finnish forces which had secured the town that there could be a whole German battalion in the vicinity, he chose more a cautious approach.

Instead of moving towards Kemi, JR 11 moved to secure the German supply depot located at Tornio railroad station. Arrival of Finnish battalions from Röyttä took Germans by surprise since so far they had thought that they were dealing with just a local uprising. Both battalions of JR 11 which had moved towards the station got tied down into a battle where Germans showed near fanatical resistance.

Still on 1 October the third battalion of JR 11 was cautiously moving towards Kemi when it encountered and interned a small German detachment sent to subdue the uprising at Tornio. The Germans were finally realizing the extent of the Finnish landing and uprising, however they were not in a position to take action against the Finns at the time. The Torne river valley was essentially devoid of German forces and their forces at Kemi, under command of Division Kräutler, consisted of 4 battalions most of which had already been committed to delaying against the Finnish advance from the south along the coast.

=== Response to landing ===
The Germans responded to the pleas for reinforcements by dispatching several units towards the area. One armored unit, the second company of Panzer Abteilung 211, was sent from Rovaniemi towards Kemi over railroad with unit arriving already on morning of 2 October. Several infantry formations were detached from the groupings and rushed towards Tornio, these included one battalion from 379th Grenadier Regiment (Grenadier-Regiment 379), one from 206th Mountain Jaeger Regiment (Gebirgs-Jäger-Regiment 206) as well as the whole of the Machine Gun Ski Brigade Finland (MG-Ski-Brigade Finnland). Meanwhile, the Finns chose to further reinforce the landing instead of pushing hard from the south towards Kemi and started to ship more troops and equipment from Oulu to Tornio, the first of these to arrive was the 53rd Infantry Regiment (JR 53). The Finnish operation changed from a single regiment's diversionary attack into key operation involving several divisions.

=== 'Little-Berlin' ===
Very late in the evening of 1 October the Finnish troops of Infantry Regiment 11 captured a German supply depot – which were colloquially known as 'little-Berlins' – and found large stores of alcohol. Order and discipline disappeared from the 2nd battalion and from most of the 1st battalion as well. Later on, the newly arriving 2nd battalion of Infantry Regiment 53 was also accidentally directed to the same location with similar results. Events at 'little-Berlin' essentially meant that Finnish forces in the area lost a whole day and allowed Germans to marshal their forces. The Finns were starting to lose the initiative.

== Battle commences ==
=== German attacks ===
On 3 October the forces the Germans had gathered together between Tornio and Kemi started moving towards Tornio. Two Finnish battalions from JR 11 and one from JR 53 faced three German battalions supported with armor and artillery. The initial German attempt in the morning was repulsed and several tanks were lost. Both sides now planned to attack which caused the flanking Finnish battalion to stumble into a German battalion which resulted in both getting tied down. This however did not prevent the German main attack from forcing the Finns to retreat who however managed to halt the German advance before the situation became too grave. Though the Finns had slight numerical superiority in infantry over the Germans the Finns had no artillery at all while the Germans could deploy several artillery batteries as well as several anti-tank guns. In the afternoon of 4 October the Germans attacked again this time managing to push the Finns to the Raumo river where the lines froze. Further German attempts to cross the Raumo river on 5 October were easily repulsed by the Finns.

On the night preceding the 4 October German forces north of Tornio also attacked Finns who had advanced to Alavojakkala. Finns were forced to abandon the already surrounded fuel depot and withdraw further to the south. Later on 4 October the German forces north of Tornio consisting of 3 infantry battalions, more heavily armed than their Finnish counterparts, with artillery support faced 3 Finnish infantry battalions. Finns expected main German effort to be coming from direction of Kemi and were ill-prepared for strong German attack from the north which advanced rapidly forcing Finns to retreat several kilometers before forming new defensive line at Keropudas river.

Lack of maps, low morale – from fighting an 'unnecessary war' – and especially lack of heavy weapons contributed heavily to the Finnish failures.

=== Last attacks ===
On 6 October started the final German effort to drive Finns away from the Tornio and regain the transportation junction located there. They had deployed 6 infantry battalions with armor and artillery support for the operation, however instead of facing what two infantry regiments like they had expected Germans were on 6 October already facing 10 Finnish infantry battalions who had very limited armor (a company of T-26 tanks had been reactivated) and artillery support. Again both sides choose to press on with attacks. Germans chose to attack simultaneously from north and east while Finns dispatched a full regiment to outflank the Germans to the north of Tornio. What resulted was some of the fiercest fighting during the Lapland War. German attack from the north managed to cross the Keropudas river but was stopped and tied down by resolute Finnish defence while attack from east failed to throw Finns from their positions.

Finnish 50th Infantry Regiment (JR 50) flanked the German Machine Gun Ski Brigade Finland which had been tied down in its attack against defending JR 53 and reached the Torne river shore north of the German positions. On 7 October situation had grown bad to worse for the Germans, not only had their attacks been repulsed but attacking units had suffered heavy losses and the only reserve of the 20th Mountain Army, Brigade Finland had been encircled north of Tornio just when the Soviet offensive in the Arctic started. However Germans were not the only ones in trouble, the Finnish JR 50 which had been rushed to the battle had left most of its equipment to Röyttä and the supplies had to be carried by hand over swamps or marshy terrain. German attempts to relieve the encircled units did not succeed during 7 October. On 8 October Finns started to clean up the encirclement and attacked from all directions against surrounded Germans. Though many Germans were taken as POWs from the encirclement, many Germans managed to escape though they had suffered heavy casualties.

=== Later action at Röyttä ===
Though Germans had been able to sortie their aircraft to Röyttä even earlier the first serious attack as seen on 4 October when Germans were able to sortie a squadron of Stuka dive bombers to the port of Röyttä while Finnish fighters assigned to provide air cover remained grounded due poor weather at their base further to the south. Dive bombers scored several hits to the Finnish transports unloading at the port sinking two of them, Bore IX and Maininki near the pier greatly hampering the unloading. Air raids at Röyttä continued until the end of fighting at Tornio region.

Later on 6 October 1944 first small squadron from Finnish Navy consisting of gunboats Hämeenmaa and Uusimaa and patrol boats VMV 15 and VMV 16 arrived to the location to both provide anti-aircraft fire and to suppress German battery located at Laivaniemi within firing distance from the port which had kept harassing the Finnish effort to unload their transports. Auxiliary gunboat Aunus arrived later on. On the same day – 6 October – several Focke-Wulf Fw 200 bombers bombed Ryöttä using Henschel Hs 293 glide bombs but without results.

== Hostages ==
As a response to the Finns' landing at Tornio and the capturing of German troops, the Germans started to take Finnish civilians as hostages: 132 from Kemi and a further 130 from Rovaniemi, and attempted to trade these for the captured Germans. During fighting at Tornio, a German negotiator arrived with the demand that the Finns were required to release their prisoners and withdraw back to Röyttä, or else the Germans would execute the hostages. The Finnish response was that such an action would result in the immediate execution of all captured German POWs. The German plan backfired since it had negligible impact on Finnish actions and only managed to further stain the German - especially Rendulic's - reputation in Finland. Hostage drama also offered the Finnish media an excellent propaganda tool which could be worked against the Germans. The Germans realized their mistake and on 12 October they abandoned the hostages to the advancing Finns at Jaatila.

== Aftermath ==
While the fighting at Tornio still continued the German leadership made a decision to move from Operation Birke to Operation Nordlicht and abandon the most of northern Finland and Norway. The Soviet offensive near Petsamo started soon after Germans had made their decision. Strict marching discipline enforced by Germans, German motorized units and effective demolition of transportation network meant that after battle of Tornio Finnish troops could effectively engage withdrawing Germans only at the time and place of Germans' choosing.

The original Finnish plan had been to cut off the German troops around Kemi from all ways of retreat. However, the German troops were able to secure the road to Rovaniemi and retreat in an orderly fashion. On the other hand, the capture of Tornio effectively cut the German troops in Finland into two parts: one fighting in Tornio river valley, the other in the Kemi river valley. Due to lack of roads, the supplies to the troops around Kemi would have to be routed through Rovaniemi. By October 8 the whole Kemi-Tornio area had been cleared.

The German commander in the North, General Lothar Rendulic considered the capture of Tornio a betrayal by the Finns and ordered the scorched earth destruction of Lapland in retaliation. By attacking Tornio the Finnish government had proven to the Soviet Union that it was working actively to remove the German troops. In addition, the Finnish army had shown that it was capable and willing to turn its arms against the former cobelligerents.

== Bibliography ==
- Hyvönen, Osmo (1991). Tornio 1944 (in Finnish). Jyväskylä: Gummerus Kirjapaino Oy. ISBN 951-749-144-1.
- Ahto, Sampo (1980). Aseveljet vastakkain – Lapin sota 1944–1945 [Brothers in arms against each other – Lapland War 1944–1945] (in Finnish). Helsinki: Kirjayhtyma. ISBN 951-26-1726-9.
