= Simojoki =

Coordinates: 65°37′N 025°03′E

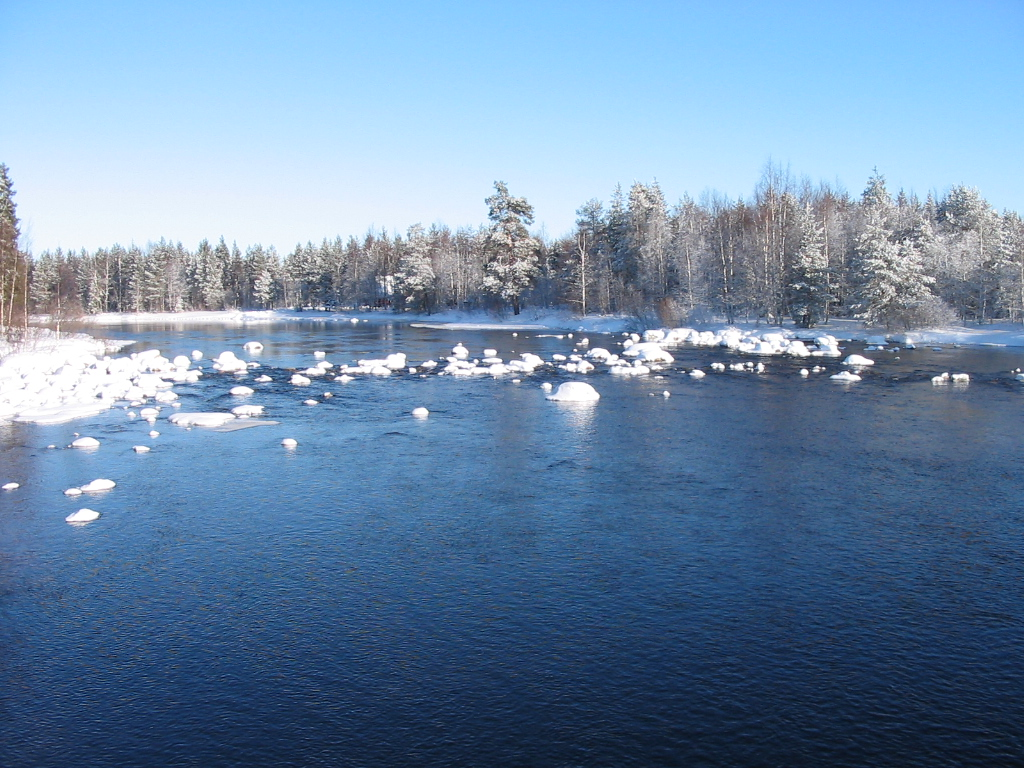
- Simojoki river in Ranua

Location
- Country: Finland

Physical characteristics
- Source
  - location: Simojärvi at Ranua
  - elevation: 176 m (577 ft)
- Mouth
  - location: Bothnian Bay at Simo
- Length: 193 km (120 mi)
- Basin size: 3,160 km^{2} (1,220 sq mi)

Simojoki is a river of Finland in the region of Lapland. It flows for 193 kilometres (120 mi) from Lake Simöjarvi in Ranua into the Bothnian Bay at Simo. Simojoki is the only river flowing inside of Finnish that has its own wild, naturally-reproducing salmon population. Over 60 kilometers of the river is open for fishing, while the Simojoki also boasts a 5400 salmon landing record from 2016. The river additionally features numerous rapids, and is a popular destination for fly fishing and lure fishing for salmon, grayling, pike, and perch.

A 2581 fishing permit is needed in order to legally fish along the Simojoki river, and a fishery management fee must be paid. Before fishing, visitors are required to be familiar with the permitted fishing locations and fishing rules. Fishing for salmon is prohibited by September 1 to November 30.

A fisherman's catch report log is available online.

== See also ==
- List of rivers in Finland
