= Lapland War =

1944–1945 war between Finland and Germany

- Part of the Eastern Front of World War II
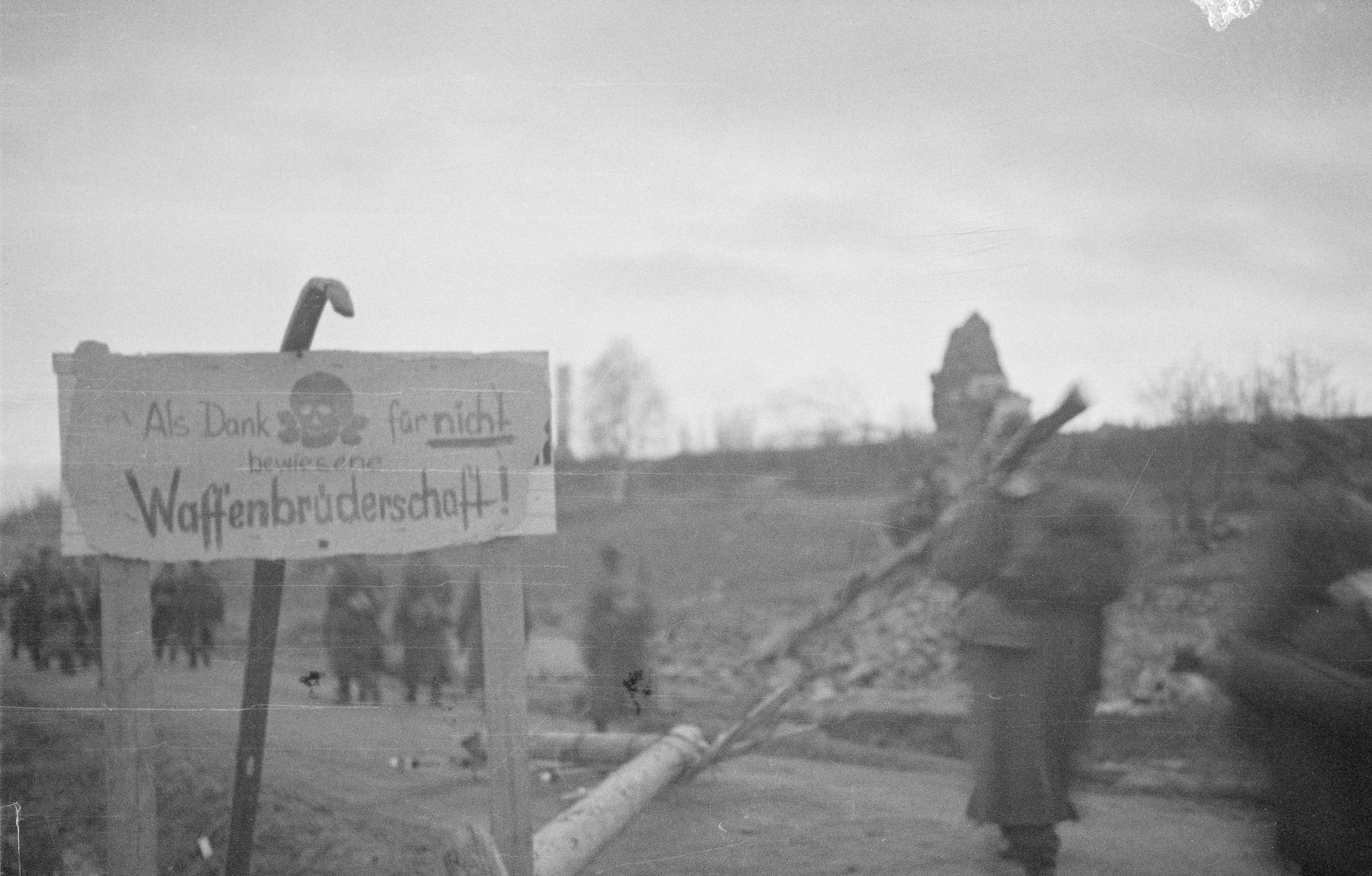
- A sign which the Germans left in Muonio, Lapland, written on it: 'As thanks for not demonstrating brotherhood in arms!'
Date	15 September 1944 – 27 April 1945; (7 months, 1 week and 5 days)
Location	Suursaari (Gogland) and Lapland
Result	Finnish victory

Belligerents
Germany	Finland; Minor air support: Soviet Union (Note: Minor air support in Operation Tanne Ost only. Further extent of Soviet belligerence in the Lapland War is debatable. Gebhardt and Ziemke mention the German withdrawal from Lapland and Finnmark, as well as the Soviet Petsamo–Kirkenes Offensive as operations of the Second World War that were either strategically overlapping or as a continuum of events without a clear stance. Jowett and Snodgrass write about the war as a conflict between German and Finnish troops, but include the offensive in the war's timeline. Zabecki begins by mentioning that Lapland extends to Norway and the Soviet Union. He states that the "Finnish War of Lapland" started between Finland and Germany, but links the Soviet offensive to it. Jaques writes of the offensive as a part of the war in a dictionary of battles.)

Commanders and leaders
(Nazi Germany) Lothar Rendulic; (Nazi Germany) Mathias Kräutler; (Nazi Germany) August Krakau	(Finland) Hjalmar Siilasvuo; (Finland) Aaro Pajari; (Finland) Ruben Lagus

Strength
214,000 (Note: Most of the 214,000 Germans served until the end of August 1944, but the number plummeted as the Germans withdrew or proceeded to Norway.)	75,000 (Note: Most of the 75,000 Finns served until the end of October 1944, but the number dropped to 12,000 soldiers in December 1944.)

Casualties and losses
~1,000 dead; ~1,300 missing; ~2,000 wounded; ~4,300 total casualties	774 dead; 262 missing; 2,904 wounded; 3,940 total casualties

During World War II, the Lapland War (Note: (Finnish: Lapin sota; Swedish: Lapplandskriget; German: Lapplandkrieg)) saw fighting between Finland and Nazi Germany – effectively from September to November 1944 – in Finland's northernmost region, Lapland. Though the Finns and the Germans had been fighting together against the Soviet Union since 1941 during the Continuation War (1941–1944), peace negotiations between the Finnish government and the Allies of World War II had been conducted intermittently during 1943–1944, but no agreement had been reached. The Moscow Armistice, signed on 19 September 1944, demanded that Finland break diplomatic ties with Germany and expel or disarm any German soldiers remaining in Finland.

The Wehrmacht had anticipated this turn of events and planned an organised withdrawal to Nazi-occupied Norway, as part of Operation Birke (Birch). Despite a failed offensive landing operation by Germany in the Gulf of Finland, the evacuation proceeded peacefully at first. The Finns escalated the situation into warfare on 28 September after Soviet pressure to adhere to the terms of the armistice. The Finnish Army was required by the Soviet Union to push Wehrmacht troops out of Finnish territory. After a series of minor battles, the war came to an effective end in November 1944, when all of the Wehrmacht troops had reached Norway or the border area and took fortified positions. The last Wehrmacht soldiers left Finland on 27 April 1945, shortly before the end of World War II in Europe.

The Finns considered the war a separate conflict because hostilities with other nations had ceased after the Continuation War. From the German perspective, it was a part of the two campaigns to evacuate from northern Finland and northern Norway. Soviet involvement in the war amounted to monitoring Finnish operations, minor air support and entering northeastern Lapland during the Petsamo–Kirkenes offensive. The military impact was relatively limited with each side sustaining around 4,000 in total casualties, although the Germans' delaying scorched earth and land mine strategies devastated Finnish Lapland. The Wehrmacht successfully withdrew, and Finland upheld its obligations under the Moscow Armistice, but it remained formally at war with the Soviet Union and the United Kingdom until ratification of the 1947 Paris Peace Treaty.

== Prelude ==
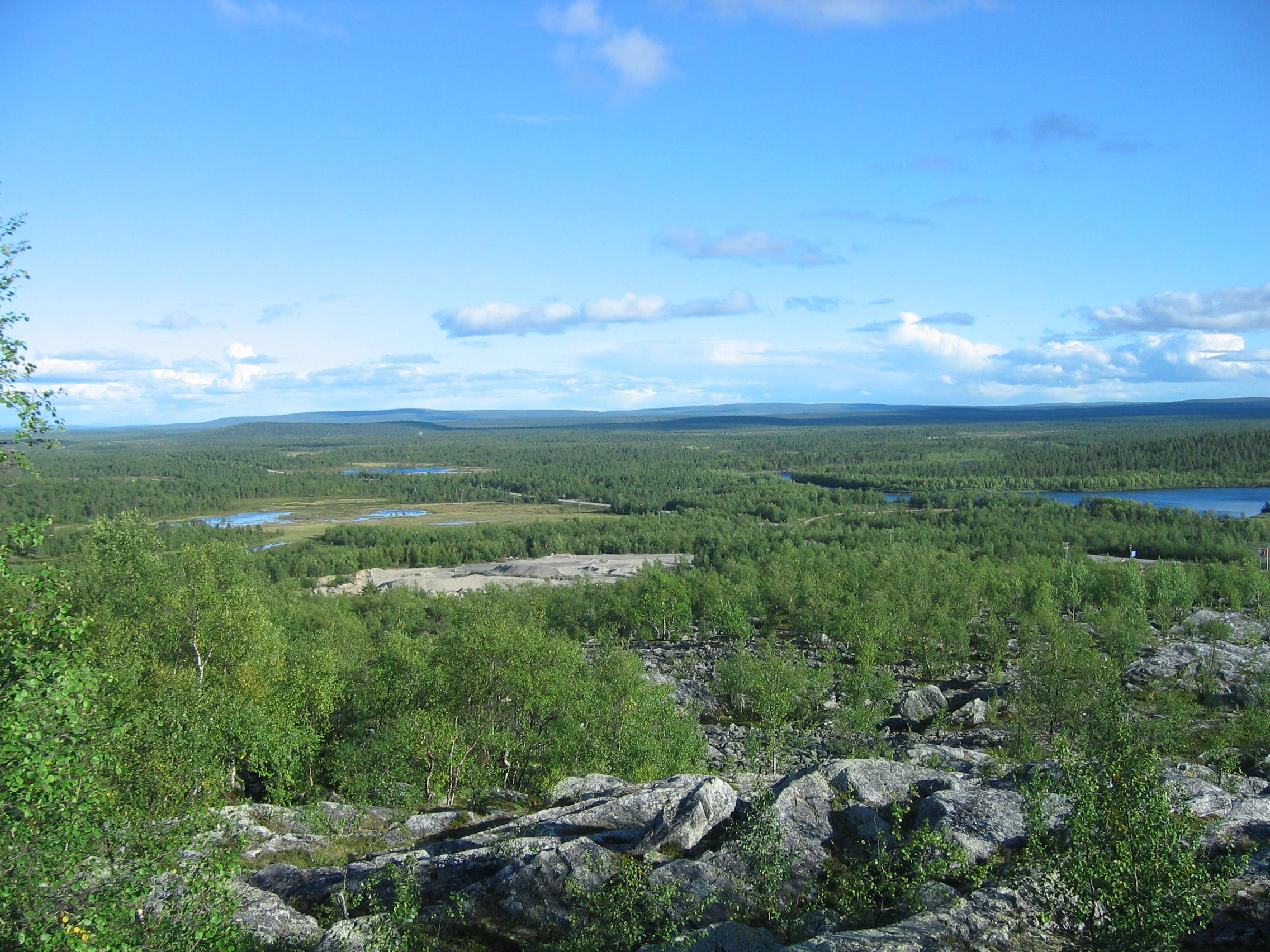
A view in 2007 to the south-east from Sturmbock-Stellung, a fortified German position in Finland 100 km (62 mi) from Norway

Germany and Finland had been at war with the Soviet Union (USSR) since Operation Barbarossa began in June 1941, co-operating closely in the Continuation War and Operation Silver Fox with the German 20th Mountain Army (German: 20. Gebirgsarmee) stationed in Lapland. As early as mid-1943, the German high command Oberkommando der Wehrmacht (OKW) began to plan for the eventuality that Finland might negotiate a separate peace agreement with the Soviet Union. The Germans planned to withdraw their forces northward in order to shield the nickel mines near Petsamo (Russian: Pechenga). During the winter of 1943–1944, the Germans improved the roads from northern Norway to northern Finland by extensive use of prisoner-of-war labour in certain areas. Casualties among the labouring prisoners were high, in part because many of them had been captured in southern Europe and were still in summer uniform. The Germans also surveyed defensive positions and planned to evacuate as much materiel as possible from the region, and meticulously prepared for withdrawal. On 9 April 1944, the German withdrawal plan was designated as Operation Birke. In June 1944, the Germans started to construct fortifications against a possible enemy advance from the south. The accidental death of Generaloberst Eduard Dietl on 23 June 1944 brought Generaloberst Lothar Rendulic to the command of the 20th Mountain Army.

After the Soviet strategic Vyborg–Petrozavodsk offensive in southern Finland from June to July and a change in Finnish leadership in August 1944, Finland negotiated a separate peace agreement with the USSR. The ceasefire agreement required the Finns to break diplomatic ties with Germany and publicly demand the withdrawal of all German troops from Finland by 15 September 1944. Any troops remaining after the deadline were to be expelled or disarmed and handed over to the USSR. Even with the German withdrawal operation, the Finns estimated it would take three months for the Wehrmacht to fully evacuate. The task was further complicated by the Soviet demand that the majority of the Finnish Defence Forces be demobilised while conducting a military campaign against the Germans. Before deciding to accept the Soviet demands, President Carl Gustaf Emil Mannerheim, former Finnish commander-in-chief, wrote a letter directly to Adolf Hitler:

Our German brothers-in-arms will forever remain in our hearts. The Germans in Finland were certainly not the representatives of foreign despotism but helpers and brothers-in-arms. But even in such cases foreigners are in difficult positions requiring such tact. I can assure you that during the past years nothing whatsoever happened that could have induced us to consider the German troops intruders or oppressors. I believe that the attitude of the German Army in northern Finland towards the local population and authorities will enter our history as a unique example of a correct and cordial relationship [...] I deem it my duty to lead my people out of the war. I cannot and I will not turn the arms which you have so liberally supplied us against Germans. I harbour the hope that you, even if you disapprove of my attitude, will wish and endeavour like myself and all other Finns to terminate our former relations without increasing the gravity of the situation.

== Order of battle ==
=== German ===
The 20th Mountain Army had been fighting the Soviet Karelian Front since Operation Barbarossa along the 700 km (430 mi) stretch from the Oulu River to the Arctic Ocean. It now comprised 214,000 soldiers, a considerable amount of them under Schutzstaffel (SS) formations, led by Generaloberst Rendulic. The number of active troops decreased quickly as they withdrew to Norway. The army had 32,000 horses and mules and 17,500–26,000 motorised vehicles as well as a total of 180,000 t (200,000 short tons) in rations, ammunition and fuel to last for six months. The army was positioned as follows:

- XIX Mountain Corps (German: XIX Gebirgskorps) in the far-northern Petsamo area beside the Arctic Ocean.
- XXXVI Mountain Corps in the area of Salla and Alakurtti, eastern Lapland.
- XVIII Mountain Corps was in charge of the southern flank at Kestenga and Uhtua.

=== Finnish ===
The III Corps (Finnish: III armeijakunta, III AK), led by Lieutenant General Hjalmar Siilasvuo, gradually shifted from the defence of the Vyborg–Petrozavodsk Offensive to the latitude of Oulu and was fully repositioned by 28 September. The III Corps consisted of the 3rd, 6th, and 11th Divisions as well as the Armoured Division. Additionally, four battalions formerly under German command were converted into separate detachments. Two regiments, Infantry Regiment 15 and Border Jaeger Regiment, reinforced the III Corps. In total, Finnish ground forces in the Lapland theatre were 75,000 strong. The number of Finnish troops dropped sharply as the Germans withdrew and the Finnish Army was demobilised; by December 1944 only 12,000 were left. Due to this, the Finnish soldiers were mostly conscripts, as veterans were transferred away from the front. The latter part of the war was therefore dubbed the "Children's Crusade" (Finnish: lasten ristiretki) in Finland.

== Phases of the war ==
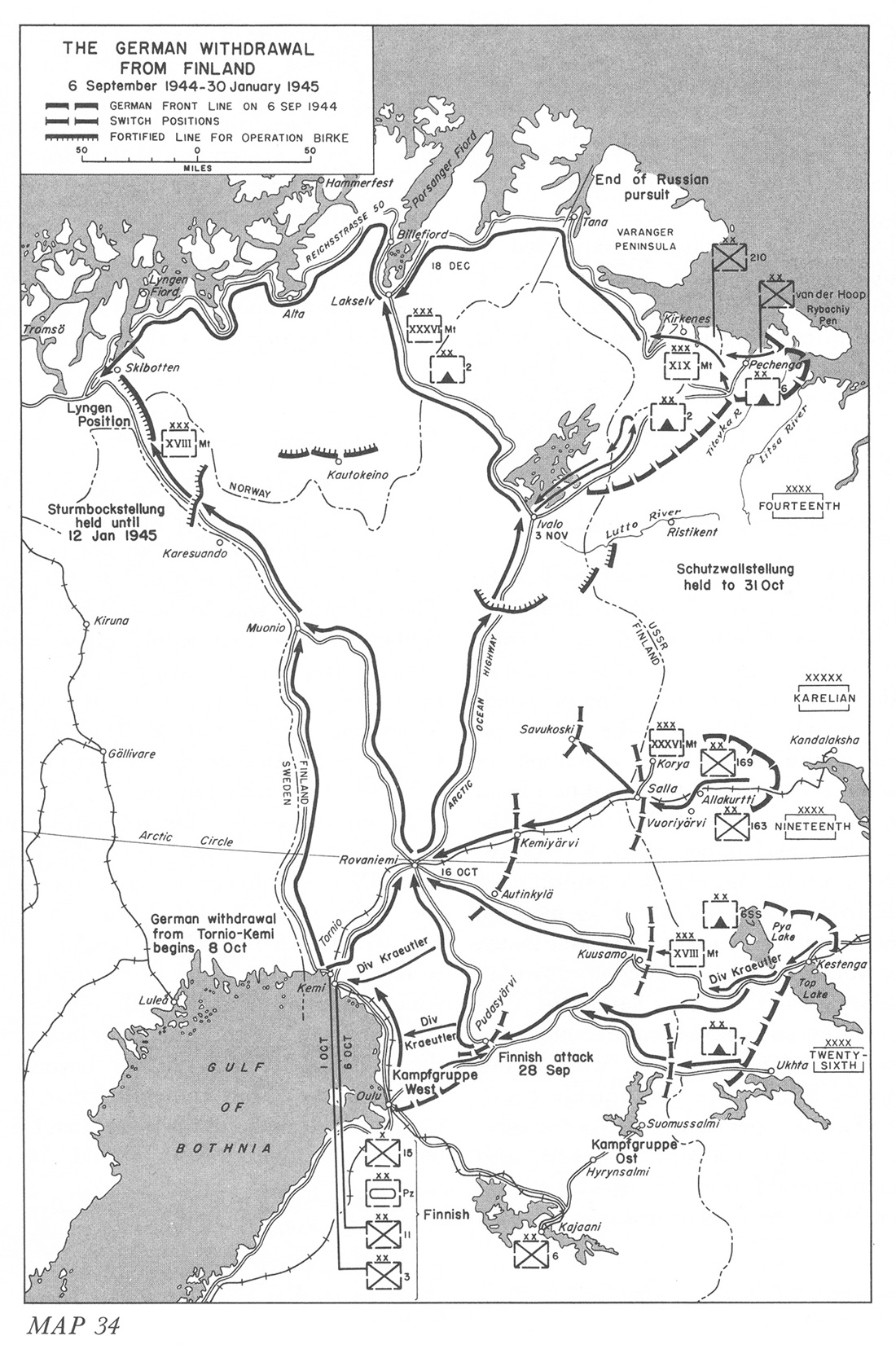
Operations Birke and Nordlicht, the German withdrawal from Finland from 6 September 1944 to 30 January 1945

=== Evacuation and naval operations in September ===
The announcement on 2 September 1944 of the ceasefire and the Moscow Armistice between Finland and the USSR triggered frantic efforts by the 20th Mountain Army, which immediately started Operation Birke. Large amounts of materiel were evacuated from southern Finland and harsh punishments were set for any hindering of the withdrawal. The Germans began to seize Finnish shipping. Finland responded by preventing ships sailing from Finland to Germany and nearly doomed the materiel evacuations of Operation Birke. So the order was rescinded and then the Finns, in turn, allowed Finnish tonnage to be used to hasten the German evacuations. The first German naval mines were laid in Finnish seaways on 14 September 1944, allegedly for use against Soviet shipping, though since Finland and Germany were not yet in open conflict, the Germans warned the Finns of their intent.

As the Finns wanted to avoid devastation of their country, and the Germans wished to avoid hostilities, both sides strove for the evacuation to be performed as smoothly as possible. By 15 September, a secret agreement had been reached by which the Germans would inform the Finns of their withdrawal timetable, who would then allow the Germans to use Finnish transport for evacuation as well as to destroy roads, railroads and bridges behind their withdrawal. In practice, friction soon arose both from the destruction caused by the Germans and from the pressure exerted on the Finns by the Soviets.

On 15 September 1944, the Kriegsmarine tried to land and seize the island of Suursaari in Operation Tanne Ost to secure shipping routes in the Gulf of Finland. The USSR sent aircraft to support the Finnish defenders and the Kriegsmarine failed to capture Suursaari. After the landing attempt, a Finnish coastal artillery fort at Utö island prevented German net-laying ships from passing into the Baltic Sea on 15 September, as they had been ordered to intern the German forces. On 16 September, a German naval detachment consisting of the German cruiser Prinz Eugen escorted by five destroyers arrived at Utö. The German cruiser stayed out of range of the Finnish 152 mm (6.0 in) guns and threatened to open fire with its artillery. In order to avoid bloodshed, the Finns allowed the net-layers to pass. In response to the German operations, Finland immediately removed its shipping from the joint evacuation operation, but the evacuation from Lapland to Norway progressed according to the secret agreement. The last German convoy departed from Kemi in northern Finland on 21 September 1944 and was escorted by submarines and, starting from south of Åland, by German cruisers.

=== Initial land battles in September and October ===
The lack of Finnish aggression did not go unnoticed by the Allied Control Commission monitoring adherence to the Moscow Armistice and the USSR threatened to occupy Finland if the terms of expelling or disarming the Germans were not met. Thus, Lieutenant General Siilasvuo ordered the III Corps to engage. The first hostilities between the Finnish Army and the 20th Mountain Army in Lapland took place 20 km (12 mi) southwest of Pudasjärvi, at around 08:00 on 28 September 1944, when Finnish advance units first issued a surrender demand and then opened fire on a small German rearguard contingent. This took the Germans by surprise as the Finns had previously agreed to warn them should they be forced to take hostile action against them. After the incident, partial contact was re-established. The Germans told the Finns they had no interest in fighting them, but would not surrender. The next incident took place on 29 September at a bridge crossing the Olhava river between Kemi and Oulu. Finnish troops, who had been ordered to take the bridge intact, were attempting to disarm explosives rigged to the bridge when the Germans detonated them, demolishing the bridge and killing, among others, the Finnish company commander. On 30 September, the Finns attempted to encircle the Germans at Pudasjärvi into a pocket (called a motti in Finnish, originally meaning 1 m^{3} (35 cu ft) of firewood) with flanking movements through the forests and managed to cut the road leading north. By then, the bulk of the German force at Pudasjärvi had already left, leaving behind only a small detachment which, after warning the Finns, blew up a munitions dump.

The risky landings for the Battle of Tornio, on the border with Sweden next to the Gulf of Bothnia, began on 30 September 1944 when three Finnish transport ships (SS Norma, SS Fritz S and SS Hesperus) departed from Oulu towards Tornio without any air or naval escorts. They arrived on 1 October and disembarked their troops without any interference. The landing had originally been planned as a diversionary raid, with the main assault to take place at Kemi, where the Finnish battalion-sized Detachment Pennanen (Finnish: Osasto Pennanen) was already in control of important industrial facilities on the island of Ajos. Various factors—including a stronger than expected German garrison at Kemi already alerted by local attacks—made the Finns switch the target to Röyttä, Tornio's outer port. The Finns initially landed the Infantry Regiment 11 (Finnish: Jalkaväkirykmentti 11) of the 3rd Division, which, together with a Civil Guard-led uprising at Tornio, managed to secure both the port and most of the town as well as the bridges over the Tornio River. The Finnish attack soon bogged down due to disorganisation caused in part by alcohol looted from German supply depots as well as stiffening German resistance. During the ensuing battle, the German Divisionsgruppe Kräutler, a reinforced regiment, conducted several counterattacks to retake the town as it formed an important transportation link between the two roads running parallel to the Kemi and Tornio Rivers. As ordered by Generaloberst Rendulic, the Germans took 262 Finnish civilian hostages in an attempt to trade them for captured soldiers. The Finns refused and the civilians were later released on 12 October.

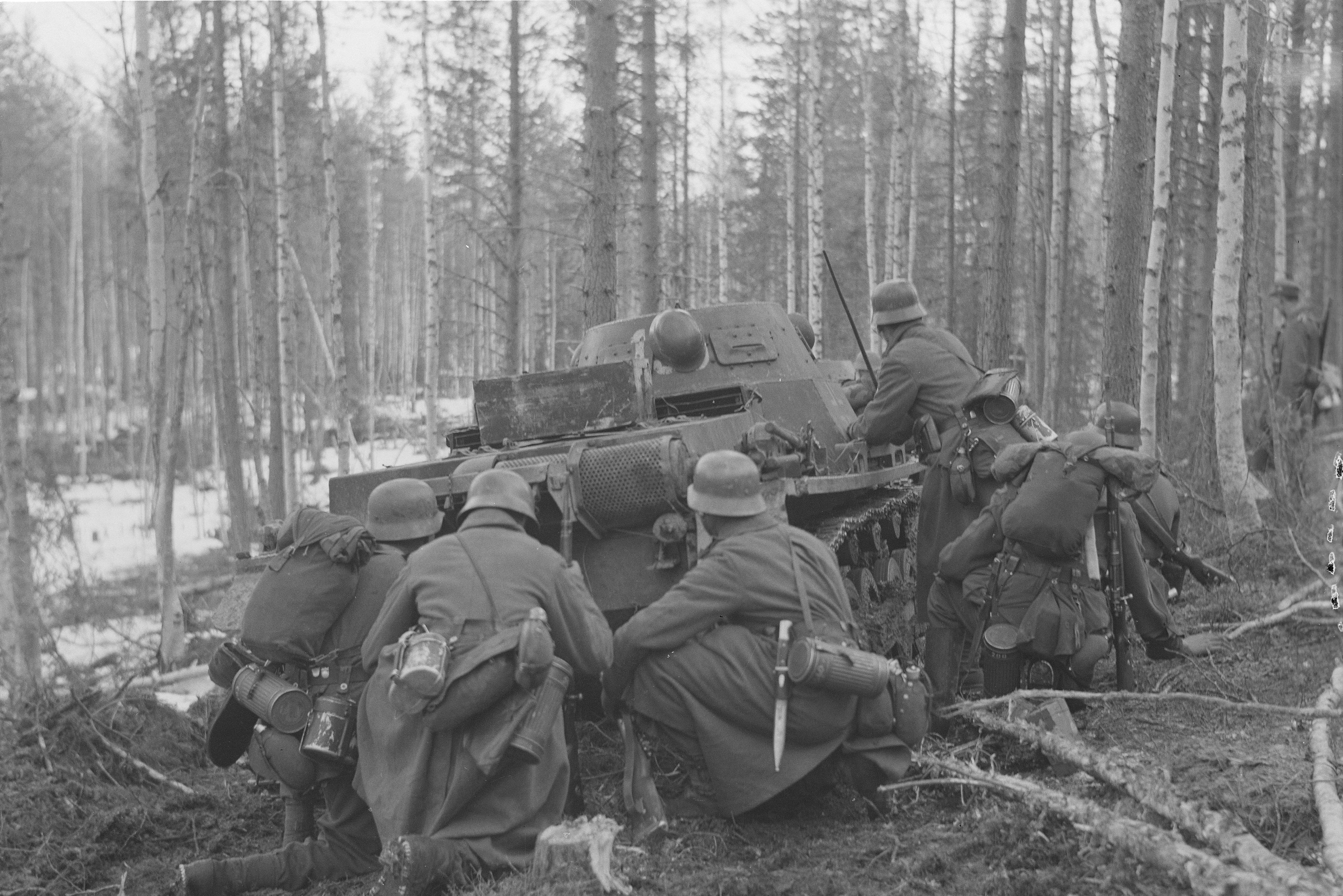
Gebirgsjäger of the XVIII Mountain Corps attacking behind Panzer cover in 1942 when Finland and Germany were still at war with the USSR together

A second wave of four Finnish ships arrived on 2 October and a third wave—three ships strong and with Brewster F2A fighter escorts—landed its troops with only a single ship being lightly damaged by German Stuka dive bombers. On 4 October, bad weather prevented Finnish air cover from reaching Tornio, leaving the fourth landing wave vulnerable. Stuka bombers scored several hits and sank the SS Bore IX and the SS Maininki alongside the pier. The fifth wave on 5 October suffered only light shrapnel damage despite being both shelled from shore and bombed from the sky. The Finnish Navy's gunboats Hämeenmaa, Uusimaa and VMV-class patrol boats 15 and 16 arrived with the sixth wave just in time to witness German Focke-Wulf Fw 200 Condor bombers attacking the shipping at Tornio with Henschel Hs 293 glide bombs without results. Arrival of naval assets allowed the Finns to safely disembark heavy equipment to support the battle and around 12,500 soldiers in total arrived during the landings. The German forces were reinforced by the 2nd Company of Panzer Abteilung 211, two infantry battalions and the MG-Ski-Brigade Finnland. The Finnish Infantry Regiment 11 was reinforced with Infantry Regiments 50 and 53. The Finns beat back German counterattacks for a week until 8 October, when the Germans withdrew from Tornio. Meanwhile, Finnish troops were advancing overland from Oulu towards Kemi, with the 15th Brigade making only slow progress against meager German resistance. Their advance was hampered by the destruction of roads and bridges by withdrawing Germans as well as a lack of spirit in both the Finnish troops and their leaders. The Finns attacked Kemi on 7 October, attempting to encircle the Germans into a motti with a frontal attack by the 15th Brigade and an attack from the rear by Detachment Pennanen. Strong German resistance, civilians in the area, and looted alcohol prevented the Finns from fully trapping all the Germans. Though Finnish forces took several hundred prisoners, they failed to prevent the Germans from demolishing the bridges over the Kemi River once they began to withdraw on 8 October.

From the start of the war, the Germans had systematically destroyed and mined the roads and bridges as they withdrew in a delaying strategy. After the first hostilities took place, Generaloberst Rendulic issued several orders on destroying Finnish property in Lapland. On 6 October, a strict order was issued which classified only military sites or military necessities as targets. On 8 October, the Germans bombed and heavily damaged factory areas of Kemi. On 9 October, the demolition order was extended to include all governmental buildings with the exception of hospitals. On 13 October, "all covers, installations and objects that can be used by an enemy" were ordered to be destroyed in northern Finland in a scorched-earth strategy. Though it was logical for the Germans to deny pursuing forces any shelter, it had a very limited effect on the Finns, who always carried tents for shelter.

=== German withdrawal effective by November ===
When Allied advances continued, German high command OKW and 20th Mountain Army leadership asserted that it would be perilous to maintain positions in Lapland and east of Lyngen Municipality in northern Norway. Likewise, Minister of Armaments and War Production Albert Speer had determined that German nickel stores were sufficient and holding Petsamo was unnecessary. Preparations for further withdrawal began. Hitler accepted the proposal on 4 October 1944, and the plan was codenamed Operation Nordlicht on 6 October. Instead of a gradual withdrawal from southern Lapland into fortified positions further to the north while evacuating materiel, as in Operation Birke, Operation Nordlicht called for a rapid and strictly organised withdrawal directly behind Lyngen Fjord in Norway, while under pressure from harassing enemy forces. As the Germans withdrew towards the town of Rovaniemi, a road junction point in Lapland, and Norway, movement was mostly limited to the immediate vicinity of Lapland's three main roads, which constricted military activities considerably. In general, the withdrawal followed a pattern in which advancing Finnish units would encounter German rear guards and attempt to flank them on foot, but the destroyed road network prevented them from bringing up artillery and other heavy weapons. As Finnish infantry slowly picked their way through the dense woods and marshland, the motorised German units would simply drive away and take up positions further down the road.

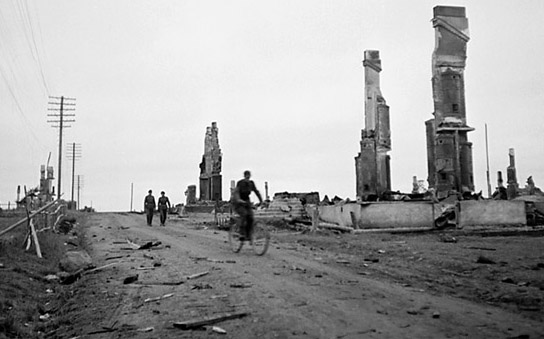
Destroyed village of Sodankylä, Finland, 10 October 1944

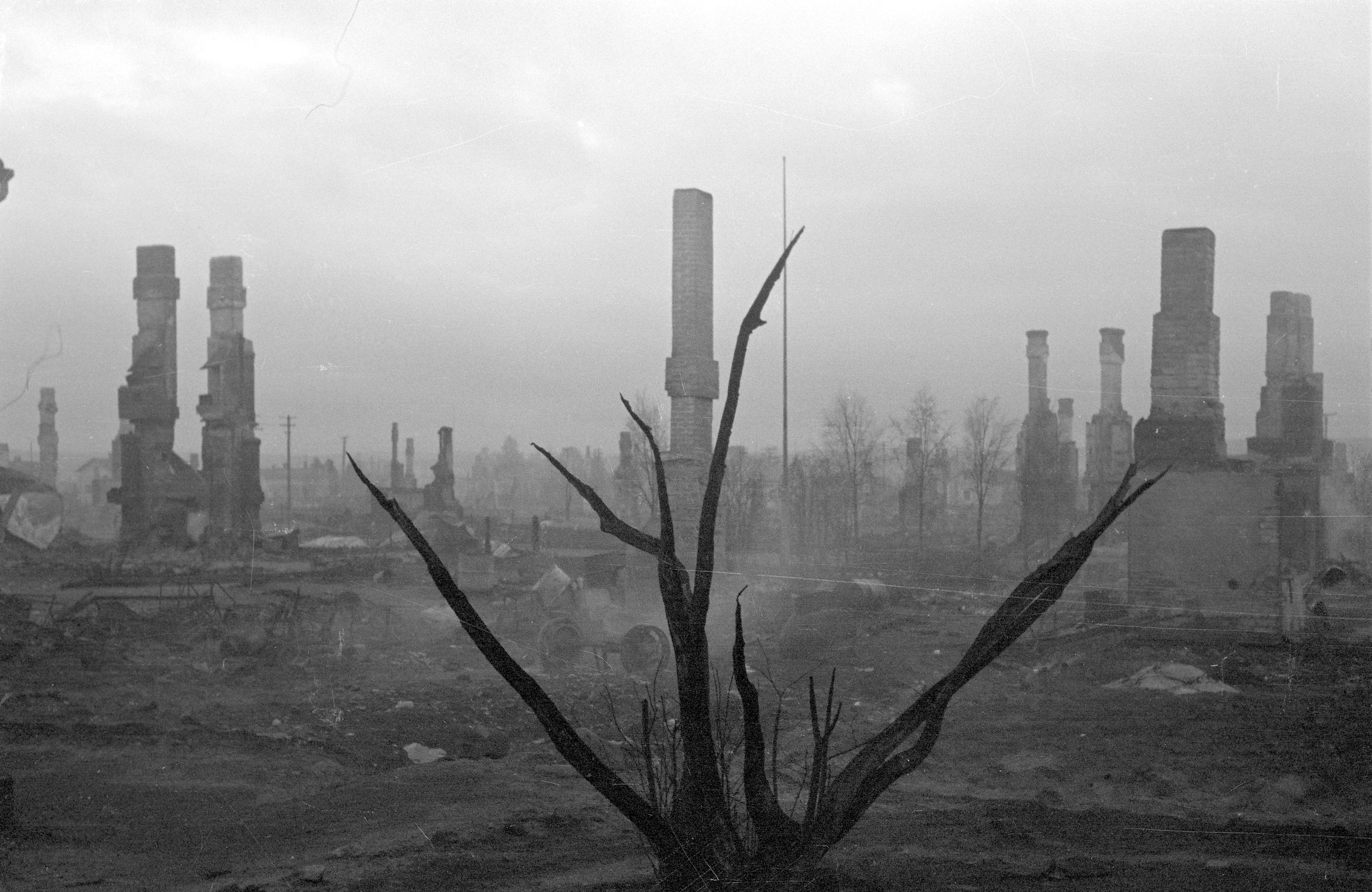
A burnt tree and ruins in Rovaniemi pictured on 16 October 1944 after the German withdrawal

On 7 October, the Finnish Jaeger Brigade forced the German Mountain Regiment 218 to fight a delaying action off of their pre-set timetable at Ylimaa, some 65 km (40 mi) south of Rovaniemi. The opposing forces were roughly even numerically and the lack of heavy weapons and exhaustion from long marches prevented the Finnish brigade from trapping the defending Germans before it received permission to withdraw on 9 October after causing substantial losses to the Finns. On 13 October, the tables were turned at Kivitaipale, some 20 km (12 mi) south of Rovaniemi, and only a fortuitous withdrawal by the Mountain Regiment 218 saved the Finnish Infantry Regiment 33 from being severely mauled. The German withdrawal allowed the Finns to surround one of the delaying battalions, but Mountain Regiment 218 returned and managed to rescue the stranded battalion. The Germans initially concentrated on destroying governmental buildings in Rovaniemi, but the fire spread and destroyed housing beyond that. German attempts to fight the fire failed and a train loaded with ammunition caught fire at the railroad station on 14 October, resulting in an explosion which spread the fire throughout the primarily wooden buildings of the town. The first Finnish units to reach the vicinity of Rovaniemi on 14 October were components of the Jaeger Brigade advancing from Ranua. The Germans repelled Finnish attempts to capture the last intact bridge over the Kemi river and then left the mostly scorched town to the Finns on 16 October 1944.

Finnish demobilisation and difficult supply routes took their toll. At Tankavaara, 60 km (37 mi) south of Ivalo, barely four battalions of the Finnish Jaeger Brigade attempted, unsuccessfully, on 26 October to dislodge the twelve-battalion-strong German 169th Infantry Division, entrenched in prepared fortifications. Finnish forces gained ground only on 1 November, when the Germans withdrew northward. Likewise, on 26 October at Muonio, 200 km (120 mi) south-east of defensive positions in Norway, the German 6th SS Mountain Division Nord reinforced by Kampfgruppe Esch again had numerical and material superiority with artillery and armoured support. This prevented the Finnish 11th Division from gaining the upper hand despite initially fairly successful flanking operations by Infantry Regiments 8 and 50. The Finns planned to isolate 6th SS Mountain, marching from the direction of Kittilä in the south-east, before Muonio and thereby entrap it within a motti. The delaying action by Kampfgruppe Esch and the destroyed road network thwarted the Finnish strategy.

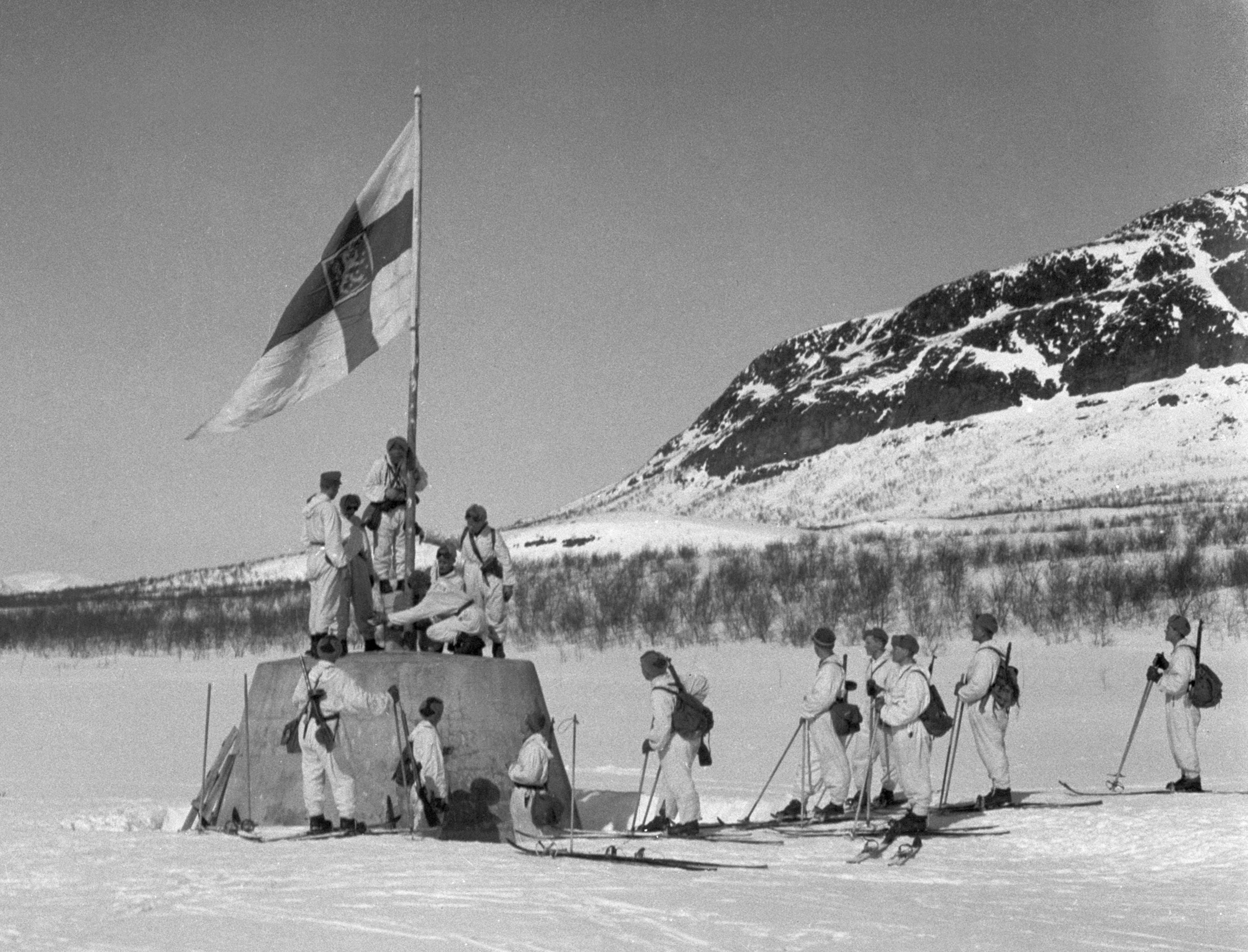
Finnish soldiers raise the flag at the three-country cairn between Norway, Sweden, and Finland on 27 April 1945 after the end of the Lapland War and thus, the end of World War II in Finland

The Soviet Karelian Front, led by General Kirill Meretskov, initiated its Petsamo–Kirkenes Offensive and started to push the XIX Mountain Corps towards Norway from Soviet territory along the Arctic coast on 7 October. By 25 October, the front captured the Norwegian port of Kirkenes. The 14th Army pursued German troops withdrawing southwest from Petsamo and Kirkenes approximately 50 km (31 mi) into Finnish territory along Lake Inari. By 5 November, Soviet reconnaissance troops met with the Finnish Army at Ivalo. Likewise, the 26th Army had followed the withdrawing XVIII Mountain Corps around 50 km (31 mi) over the Finnish border in southern Lapland to Kuusamo and Suomussalmi, but left the area in November. The Soviet troops in Ivalo did not leave until September 1945.

For most practical purposes, the war in Lapland concluded in early November 1944. After holding Tankavaara, the Germans swiftly withdrew from north-eastern Lapland at Karigasniemi on 25 November 1944. The Finnish Jaeger Brigade pursuing them had by then been mostly demobilised. In north-western Lapland, only four battalions of Finnish troops were left on 4 November and by February 1945, a mere 600 men. The Germans continued their withdrawal but remained in positions first at Palojoensuu village, 150 km (93 mi) from Norway, in early November 1944. From there, they moved to the fortified Sturmbock-Stellung position along the Lätäseno River, 100 km (62 mi) from Norway, on 26 November. The German 7th Mountain Division held these positions until 10 January 1945 when northern Norway had been cleared and positions at Lyngen Fjord were manned. On 12 January, the Finnish minelayer Louhi was sunk with the loss of its ten sailors in the Gulf of Bothnia by the German submarine U-370 using an acoustic G7es torpedo. Some German positions defending Lyngen extended over to Kilpisjärvi on the Finnish side of the border, but no major activity occurred. The Wehrmacht completely withdrew from Finland by 27 April 1945 and a Finnish battle patrol raised the flag on the three-country cairn between Norway, Sweden and Finland to celebrate the end of the wars.

There was never an official peace agreement signed between Finland and Germany. It was not until 1954 that the government of Finland officially noted that "the hostilities have ceased and interaction between Finland and Germany since then developed peacefully" and thus "the war has ended".

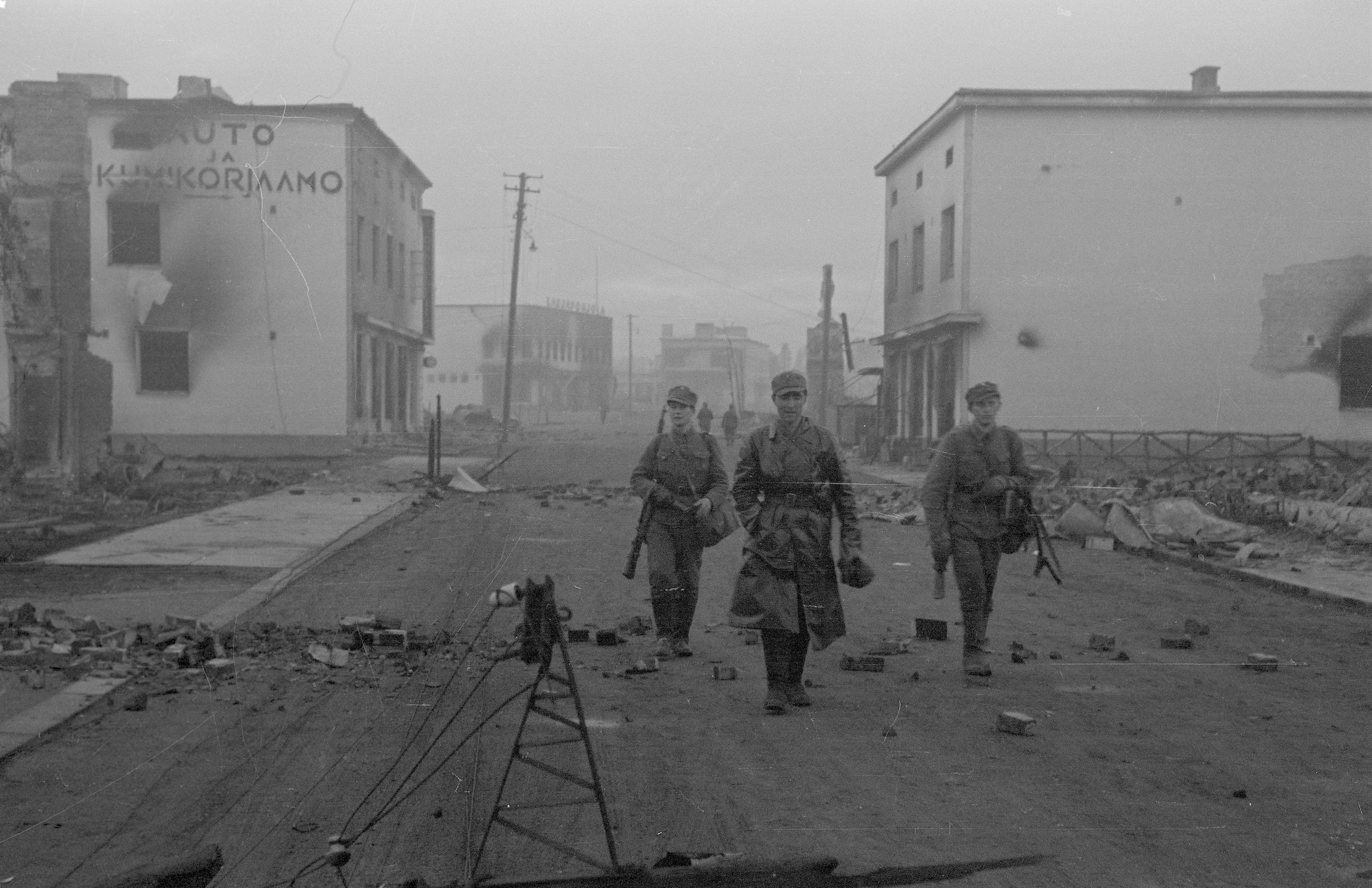
Finnish Troops in Rovaniemi (1944)

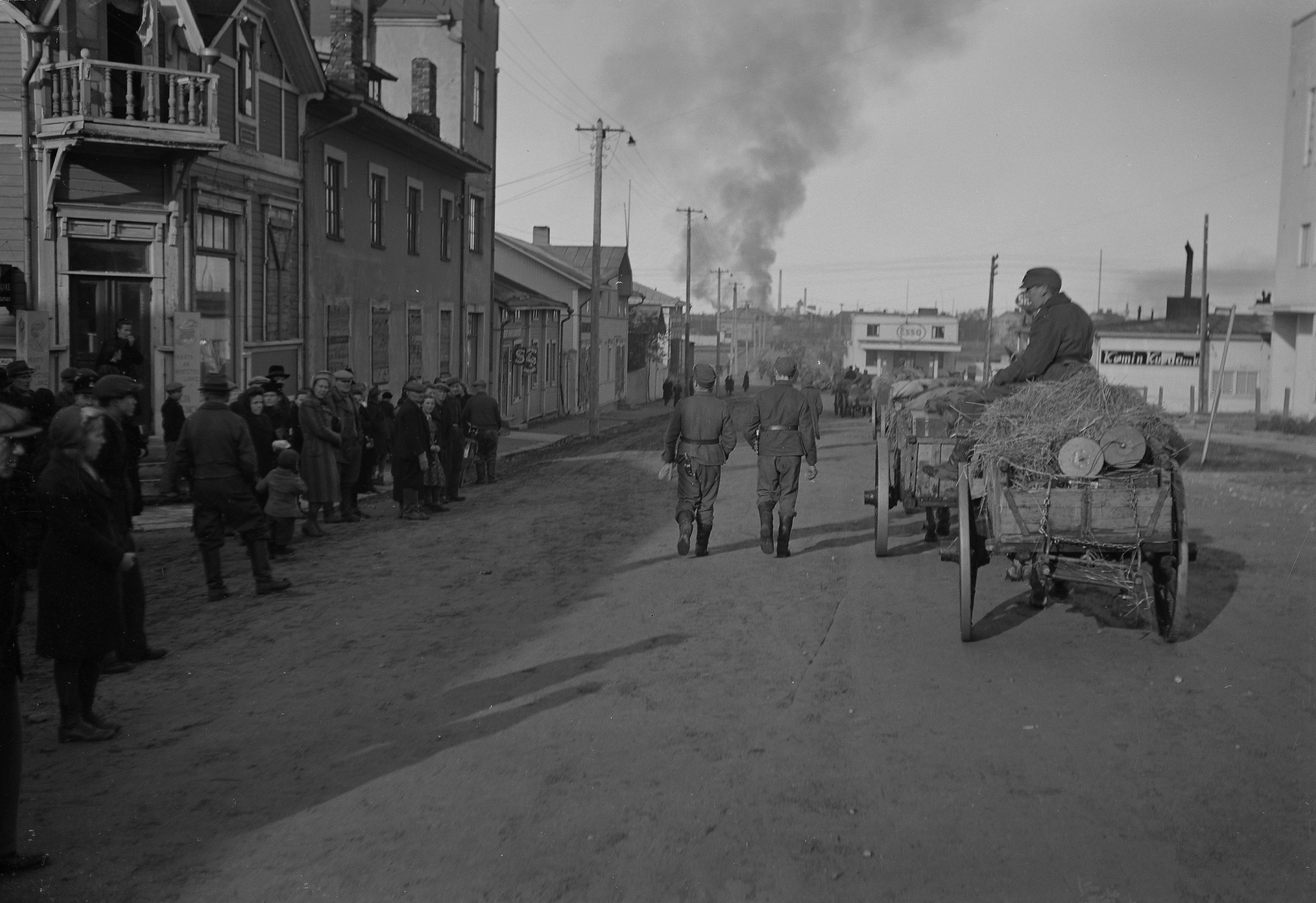
The Valtakatu street in Kemi (1944)

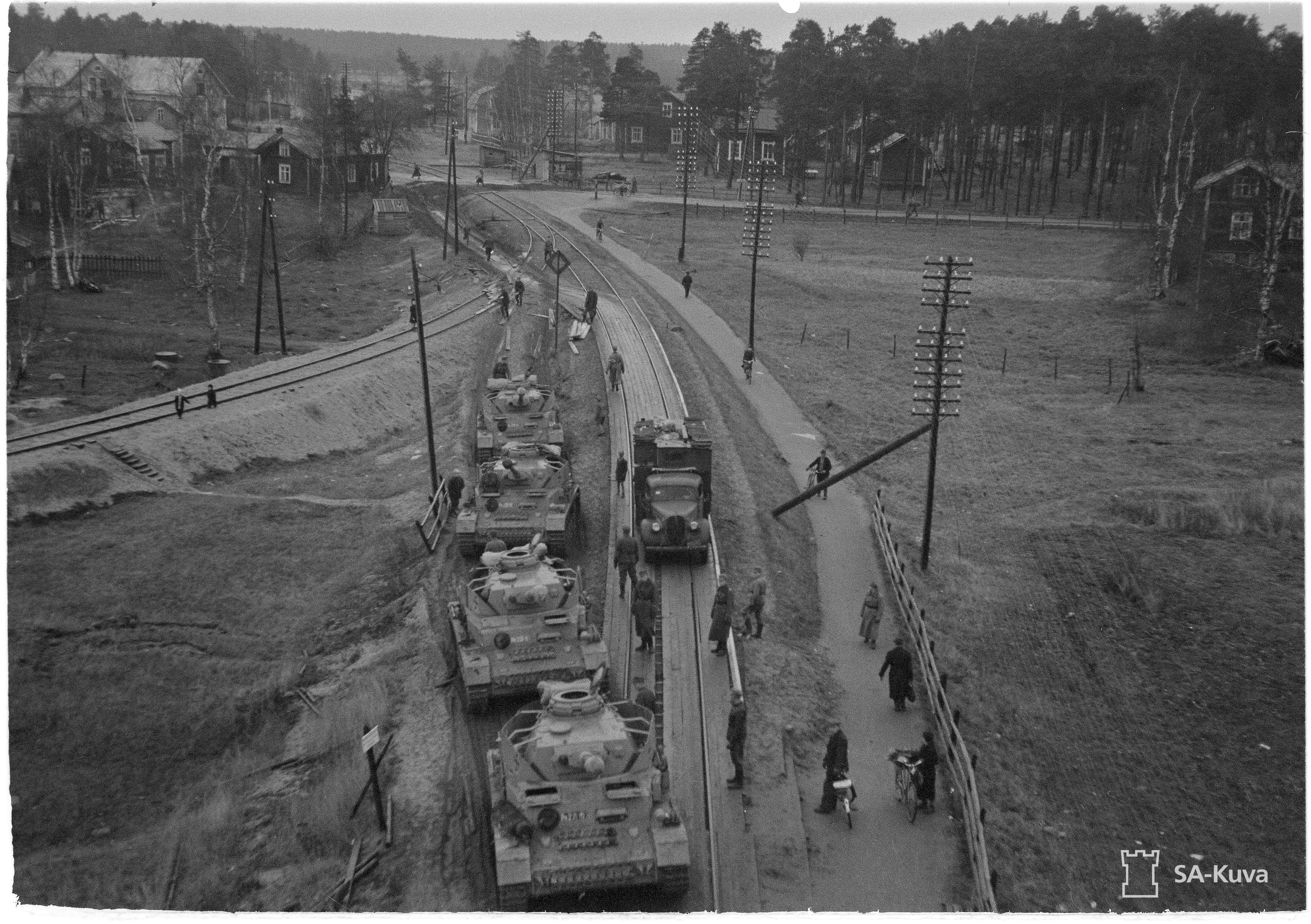
Armored vehicles on the march in Oulu (1944)

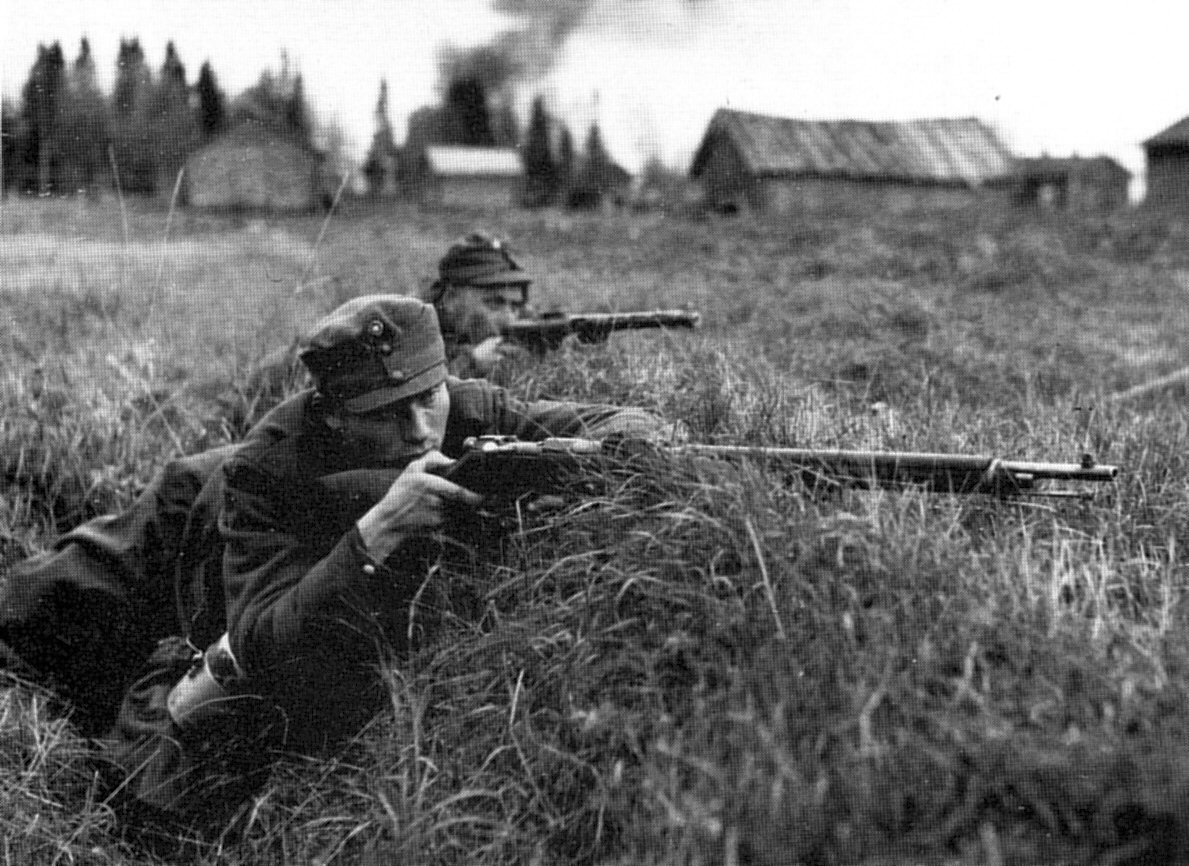
Finnish infantry in Tornio (1944)

== Aftermath ==
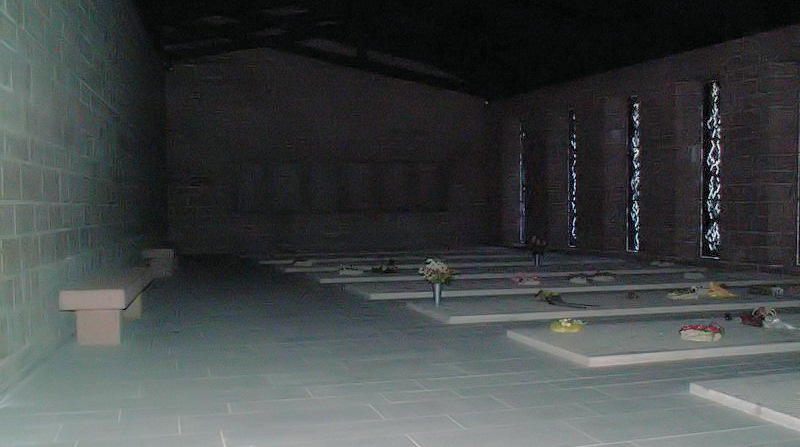
German military cemetery in Rovaniemi, Finland

The 20th Mountain Army successfully withdrew most of its over 200,000 men as well as supplies and equipment from Lapland to continue defending occupied Finnmark from the USSR. According to American historian Earl F. Ziemke, "it had no parallel" as an evacuation across the Arctic in winter. The casualties of the conflict were relatively limited: 774 killed, 262 missing and around 2,904 wounded Finns. Germany experienced around 1,000 deaths and 2,000 wounded. 1,300 German soldiers became prisoners of war and were handed over to the USSR according to the terms of the armistice. The German delaying operations left Lapland devastated. In addition to 3,100 buildings demolished elsewhere in Finland, estimates of destroyed infrastructure in Lapland are as follows:

- 14,900 buildings representing around 40–46 percent of Lapland's property;
- 470 km (290 mi) of railway;
- 9,500 km (5,900 mi) of road;
- 675 bridges;
- 2,800 road storm drains;
- 3,700 km (2,300 mi) of phone and telegram lines.

The reconstruction of Lapland lasted until the early 1950s, although the railway network was not functional until 1957. In addition to the demolished infrastructure, the Wehrmacht extensively laid mines and explosives in the area. By 1973, over 800,000 cartridges, 70,000 mines and 400,000 other explosives had been demined in Lapland, a total of 1,142,000 units.

== In popular culture ==
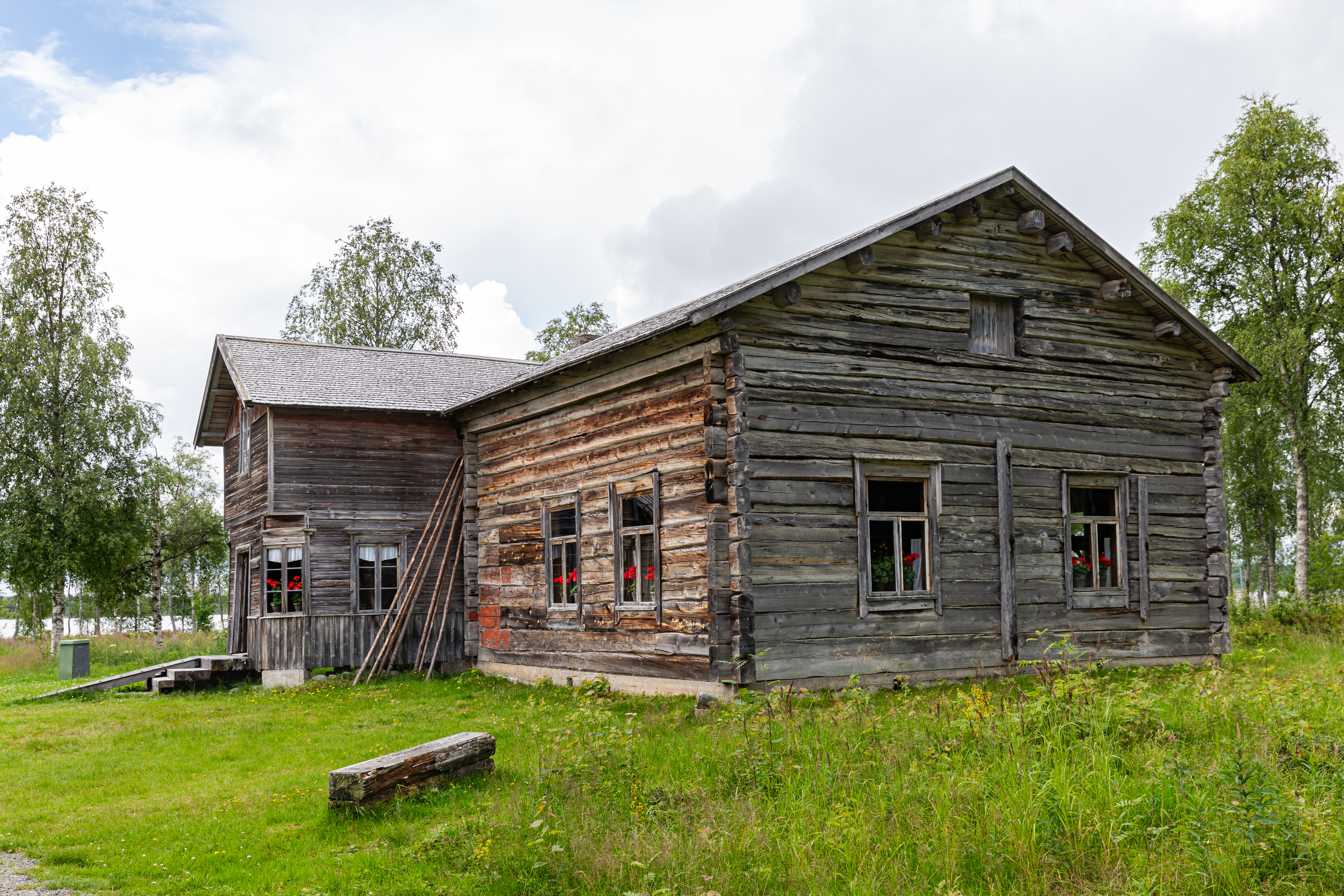
Almost all the buildings were destroyed in Kuusamo and Lapland by the German army during WW2. Only a few old houses have survived. Today the houses serve as local history museums.

The 2011 novel The Midwife by Katja Kettu is based on the war, on the basis of which Antti Jokinen made the film Wildeye in 2015.

The Cuckoo is a 2002 Russian historical comedy drama film directed by Aleksandr Rogozhkin. The film takes place in Lapland during the final phases of Continuation War directly leading to the Lapland War, taking the perspective of opposing Soviet and Finnish soldiers stranded at a Sámi woman's farmhouse. "Kukushki" was the nickname given by Soviet soldiers to Finnish cuckoo snipers, who ambushed their targets from a purpose-built tree-branch-nest.

The 2022 Finnish action film Sisu, directed by Jalmari Helander, is set during the Lapland War.

Aku Louhimies, director of the 2017 war film The Unknown Soldier, announced that he is working on a film called Lapland War (Lapin sota), which is based on the 2012 novel The Iron Boot (Rauta-antura) by Antti Tuuri. The film premiered in September 2026.

== See also ==
- Aarne Juutilainen
- Arctic naval operations of World War II
- Cold-weather warfare
- Fell
- Gebirgsjäger
- Lapplandsender
- Finland in World War II
