= Simojärvi =

Lake in Ranua, Finland

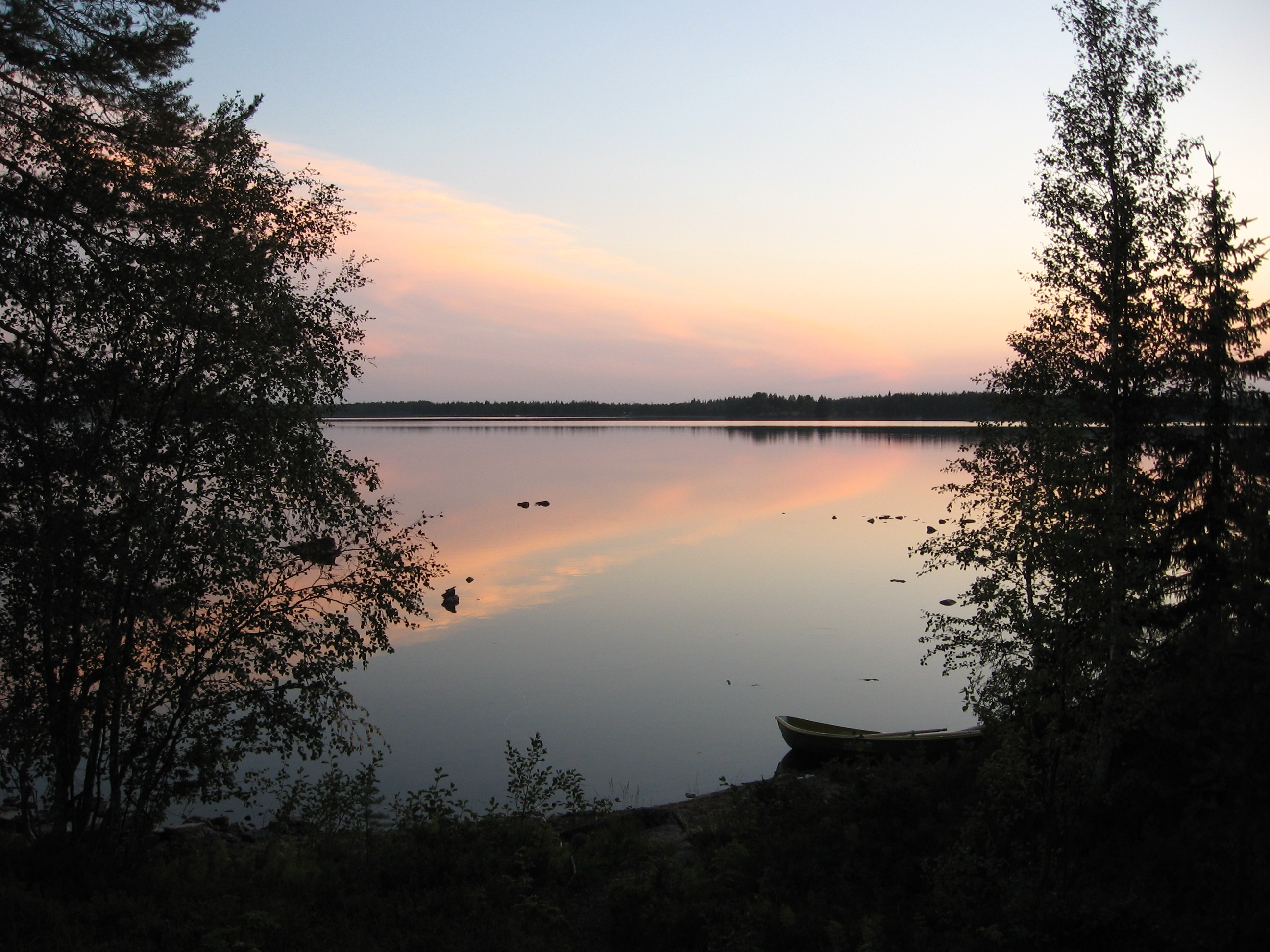
- Simojärvi

- Location within Finland
- Location: Ranua, Finland
- Coordinates: 66°06′N 027°03′E
- Primary outflows: Simojoki
- Catchment area: Simojoki
- Basin countries: Finland
- Surface area: 89.93 km^{2} (34.72 sq mi)
- Average depth: 5 m (16 ft)
- Max. depth: 27 m (89 ft)
- Water volume: 0.45 km^{3} (360,000 acre⋅ft)
- Shore length^{1}: 239.95 km (149.10 mi)
- Surface elevation: 176.3 m (578 ft)
- Islands: Porosaari, 4.58 km^{2} (1.77 sq mi)
- Settlements: Ranua
- ^{1} Shore length is not a well-defined measure.

Simojärvi is a medium-sized lake of Finland located in Ranua, in the region of Lapland. It belongs to Simojoki main catchment area.

== See also ==
- List of lakes in Finland
