= Armoured Division (Finland) =

Division of the Finnish Army

The Armoured Division (Finnish: Panssaridivisioona, PsD or Ps. D) was an armoured division of the Finnish Army during the Continuation War.

Finnish armoured vehicles roundel (WWII)

== Foundation ==
The Finnish Supreme headquarters ordered the foundation of an armoured division on 28 June 1942 and the actual foundation was on 30 June 1942. The division consisted of the newly formed Armoured Brigade and the old (1st) Jaeger Brigade. The Cavalry Brigade was also part of the division until January 1943. The division artillery consisted of the 14th Heavy Artillery Battalion. The division commander was Major General Ruben Lagus. During most of the war, the division was located at Petrozavodsk, but in the spring of 1944 it was moved to the Karelian Isthmus to form the reserve of the headquarters.

== Battles ==
- Battle of Kuuterselkä, Continuation War, June 1944
- Battle of Tali-Ihantala, Continuation War
- Battle of Vuosalmi, Continuation War, July 1944
- Battle of Rovaniemi, Lapland War, October 1944

== Order of battle 1944 ==
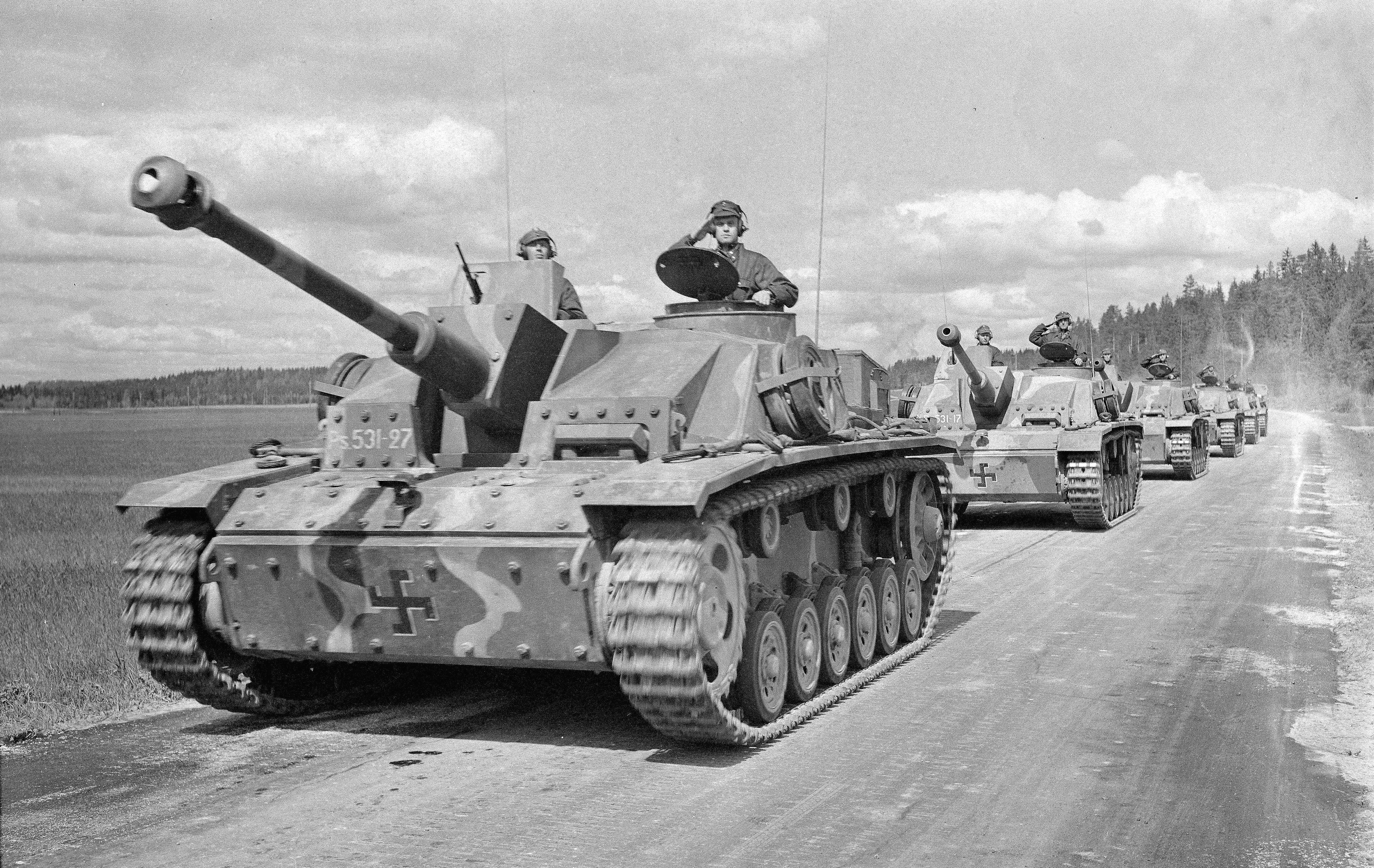
Finnish StuG IIIs

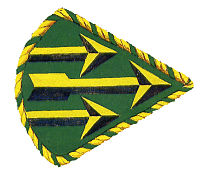
The unique insignia of the Armoured Division, the Arrows of Lagus

- Division Headquarters
  - Headquarters Company
  - Armoured Brigade
    - Headquarters Company
    - 1st Armoured Battalion (T-26, T-26E), Armoured car company with FAIs and BA-10s
    - 2nd Armoured Battalion (T-26, T-26E, heavy company with KV-1 heavy tanks, T-28 and T-34 medium tanks)
    - Armoured Training Battalion (older types and a few T-26s)
    - Separate Armour Company (BT-42 assault guns)
    - Signal Company
    - Maintenance Company
  - Jaeger Brigade
    - 2nd Jaeger Battalion
    - 3rd Jaeger Battalion
    - 4th Jaeger Battalion
    - 5th Jaeger Battalion
    - Anti-Tank Battalion (towed 50mm Pak 38 and 75mm Pak 40 anti-tank guns)
    - Replacement Jaeger Battalion
    - Signal Company
  - Assault Gun Battalion (StuG IIIG)
  - 14th Heavy Artillery Battalion (15 cm sFH 18)
  - 6th Signal Battalion
  - 3rd Pioneer Battalion
  - Armoured Air Defence Battery (Landsverk Anti II self-propelled anti-aircraft guns)
  - Logistics Formations

== Disbanding ==
The Armoured Division was disbanded during the Lapland War on 30 December 1944.
