= Impiö =

Impiö is a Finnish surname. Notable people with the surname include:

- Lauri Impiö (1929–2006), Finnish Lutheran clergyman and politician
- Taina Impiö (born 1956), Finnish cross country skier
