= Kaisa Hietala =

Finnish business executive (born 1971)

Kaisa H. Hietala
- Born: 1971 (age 54–55); Ranua, Finland
- Education: MS Geophysics; MPhil Polar Studies
- Alma mater: University of Oulu; University of Cambridge
- Board member of: Smurfit Kappa, 2020 ExxonMobil Corp., 2021 Rio Tinto, 2023

Kaisa Helena Hietala (born 1971 in Ranua) is a Finnish business executive and board professional.

She holds a MSc in geophysics from the University of Oulu and an MPhil in polar studies from the University of Cambridge.

Kaisa Hietala worked at the Renewable Products division at petroleum refining and marketing company Neste, reaching the position of Executive Vice President. She is credited for the company's transformation to become the world’s largest and most profitable producer of renewable oil products.

In May 2021, with the backing of Engine No. 1, Hietala was elected to the board of directors of ExxonMobil, notably, one of the first environment-friendly board members of the Standard Oil descendant. Kaisa Hietala also serves on the boards of Irish packagining materials company Smurfit Kappa and multinational mining company Rio Tinto. She is also a chair and co-founder of Greencode Ventures, a Finnish venture capital firm focusing on green transition.
