= Ranuanjärvi =

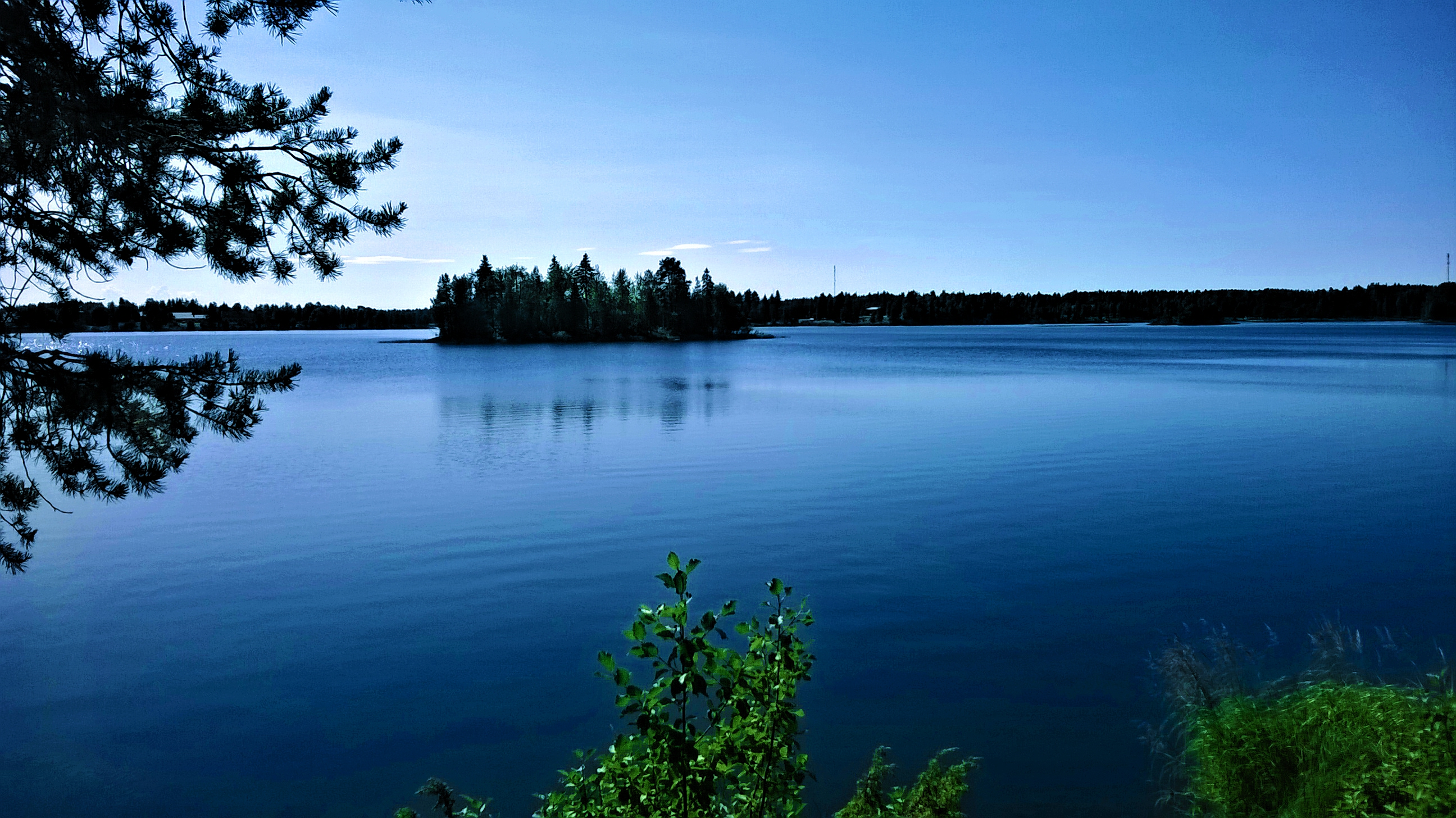
- Ranuanjärvi

- Location within Finland
- Location: Ranua, Finland
- Coordinates: 65°55.75′N 26°34.125′E
- Type: Lake
- Primary outflows: Ranuanjoki
- Catchment area: Iijoki
- Basin countries: Finland
- Surface area: 4.624 km^{2} (1.785 sq mi)
- Average depth: 2.24 m (7 ft 4 in)
- Max. depth: 8.4 m (28 ft)
- Water volume: 0.10356 km^{3} (83,960 acre⋅ft)
- Shore length^{1}: 23.28 km (14.47 mi)
- Surface elevation: 142.8 m (469 ft)
- Islands: Peltosaari, Lehtosaari
- Settlements: Ranua
- ^{1} Shore length is not a well-defined measure.

Ranuanjärvi is a small and shallow lake of Finland located in the center of municipality of Ranua, in the region of Lapland. It belongs to Iijoki main catchment area.

== See also ==
- List of lakes in Finland
