= Lapplandsender =

Nazi German military radio station in Finland and Norway

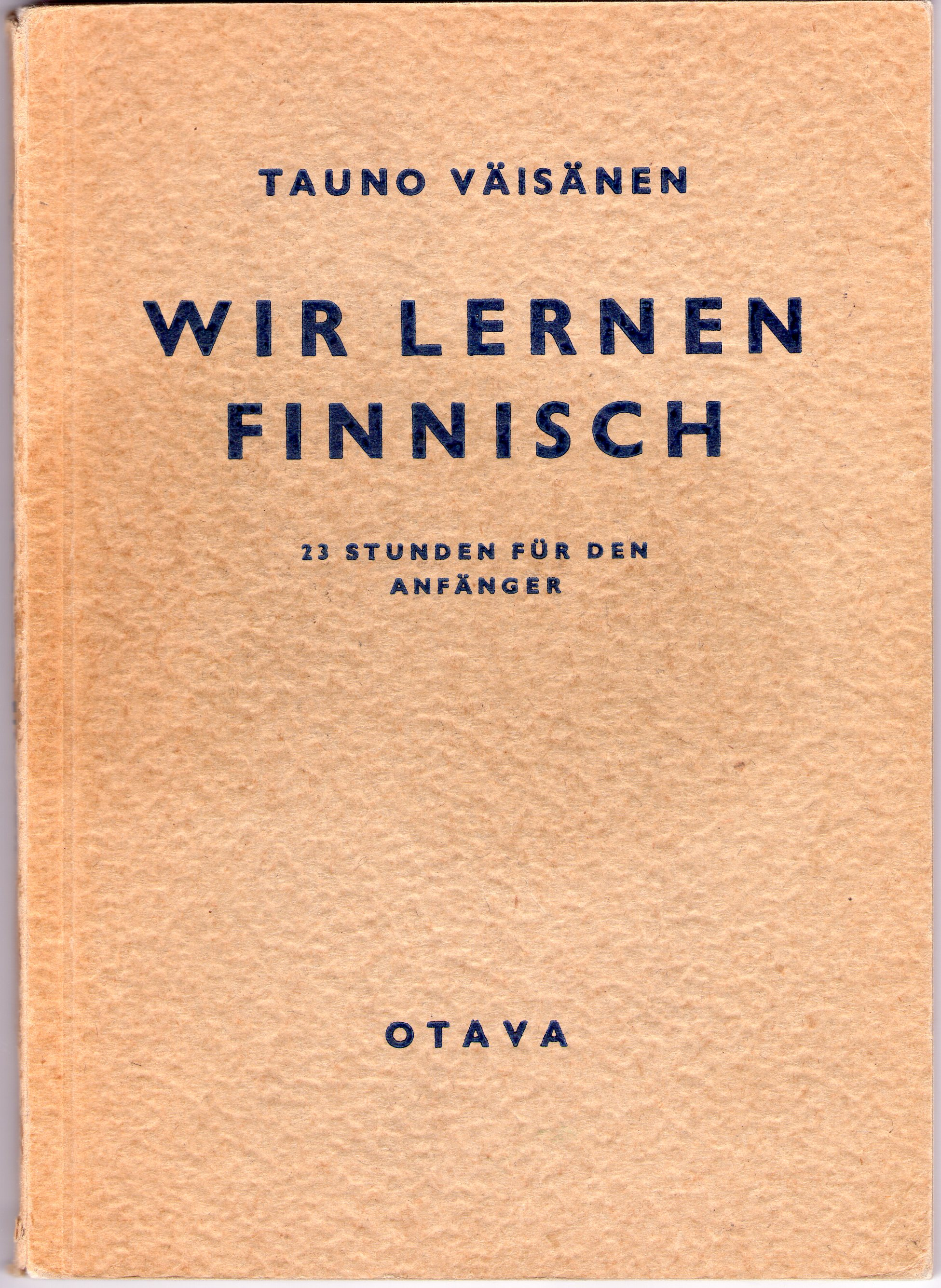
A Finnish language textbook meant for German soldiers, printed 1944

Lapplandsender (German: Soldatensender Lappland) was a World War II military radio station for Nazi German forces in Northern Finland and Northern Norway. The transmitter was in the German garrison area outside the provincial capital of Rovaniemi in the Arctic Circle. The station was under command of Propagandakompanie 680, which was one of the propaganda units of the Wehrmacht, the German army.

Lapplandsender broadcast entertainment, news and propaganda daily from December 1941. In October 1944, during their retreat from Lapland, the Germans took the station down and moved it to Bergen in Western Norway. Shortly afterwards, Rovaniemi was burned to the ground during the course of the Battle of Rovaniemi.

== See also ==
- Nazi propaganda
