= Mathias Kräutler =

Austrian military officer (1895-1968)

Mathias Ferdinand Kräutler
- Born: 2 May 1895; Vienna, Austria-Hungary
- Died: 8 September 1968 (aged 73); Salzburg, Austria
- Spouse: Gertrud Engl
- Children: 2
- Military career
- Allegiance: Austria-Hungary (1915–1918); Austria (1918–1938); Nazi Germany (1938–1945)
- Service years: 1915–1945
- Rank: Generalmajor
- Service number: A451685
- Known for: Commanding German forces in the Lapland War
- Conflicts: World War I; World War II; Lapland War
- Awards: German Cross in Gold (20 January 1945); Finnish Order of the Cross of Liberty 2nd Class

Mathias Ferdinand Kräutler (2 May 1895 – 8 September 1968) was an Austrian military officer, attaining the rank of Major General during World War II, notably serving in the Lapland War.

== Biography ==
Mathias Kräutler was born in Vienna, Austria-Hungary. He studied at the Teresian Academy between 1913 and 1915. He began his military career on March 15, 1915, by joining the Austro-Hungarian Army and participating in the First World War. After the war, on February 24, 1919, he continued his service in the Austrian Army.

From March 2, 1937, he became the commander of the 1st Battalion of the 12th Infantry Regiment. After the Anschluss on March 15, 1938, he became part of the Wehrmacht. From April 26, 1938, he was the 1st officer of the General Staff of the Commander of the 2nd Infantry. From May 20, 1938, he was the commander of the 3rd Battalion of the 12th Infantry Regiment (from August 1, 1938 onwards, it was called the 135th Mountain Infantry Regiment of the 2nd Mountain Infantry Division). On December 5–17, he passed the General Staff officer's course. From January 27, 1942, he was the commander of the 139th Mountain Infantry Regiment of the 3rd Mountain Infantry Division. On March 1, 1944, he was sent to the reserve, and completed the courses of division commander and officer of tank forces. From August 10, 1944 onwards he was given command of the "Kreutler" divisional group (from October 1 - the 140th division for special assignments, from May 5, 1945 - the 9th Mountain Infantry Division "Nord").

On May 8, 1945, he was captured by British troops. He was later dismissed on January 15, 1947. He died at the age of 73 in Salzburg.

== Ranks ==
- Lieutenant (March 15, 1915)
- Oberleutnant (November 1, 1916)
- Hauptmann (July 8, 1921)
- Major (August 31, 1931)
- Oberstleutnant (June 1, 1939)
- Oberst (February 1, 1942)
- Major General (October 1, 1944)

== Awards ==
- Medal "For Military Merit" (Austria-Hungary)
- Cross "For Military Merit" (Austria-Hungary) 3rd class with military decoration and swords - awarded twice (1918).
- Medal "For Wounding" (Austria-Hungary) with one stripe - in June 1918 he was seriously injured by falling stones.
- Commemorative military medal (Austria) with swords
- Honorary Saber for excellent pistol shooting (1930)
- Gold Medal of Honor "For Services to the Republic of Austria"
- Military Merit Cross (Austria) 3rd class (November 6, 1937)
- Commemorative military medal (Hungary) with swords
- Cross of honor of a veteran of the war with swords
- Medal "For years of service in the Wehrmacht" 4th, 3rd, 2nd and 1st class (25 years)
- The "For Wounding" breastplate in black is a replacement for the Austro-Hungarian "For Wounding" medal.
- Assault infantry badge in silver (August 30, 1941)
- Order of the Cross of Freedom 2nd class with swords (Finland; June 30, 1942)
- Medal "For the winter campaign in the East 1941/42" (August 15, 1942)
- German Cross in Gold (January 25, 1945)
