= Ruben Lagus =

Finnish general (1896–1959)

Ernst Ruben Lagus
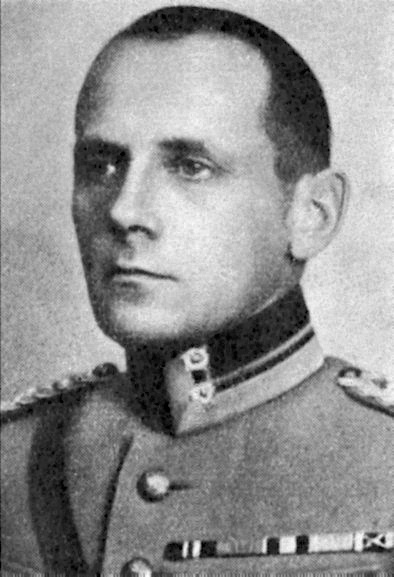
- Born: 12 October 1896; Koski Hl, Grand Duchy of Finland, Russian Empire
- Died: 15 July 1959 (aged 62) Lohja, Finland
- Allegiance: German Empire (1915–1918); Finland (1918–1947)
- Branch: Imperial German Army; (Finland) Finnish Jäger troops; Finnish Army
- Service years: 1915–1947
- Rank: Major General (1941)
- Commands: 1st Jäger Brigade (1941–1942); 5th Division (1941); Finnish Armoured Division (1942–1944); Group Lagus (1944); 2nd Division (1945–1947)
- Conflicts: World War I; Finnish Civil War; Battle of Tampere; World War II; Winter War; Continuation War; Finnish invasion of Ladoga Karelia; Finnish invasion of East Karelia (1941); Vyborg–Petrozavodsk offensive; Battle of Tali-Ihantala; Lapland War
- Awards: Mannerheim Cross; Order of the Cross of Liberty; Order of the White Rose; Iron Cross; Order of the Sword

Ernst Ruben Lagus (12 October 1896 – 15 July 1959), better known as Ruben Lagus, was a Finnish major general, a member of the Jäger Movement and the recipient of the first Mannerheim Cross. He played a central role in developing the Finnish armoured forces and led them with distinction during the Continuation War, earning the nickname "Finland's Rommel". He participated in the Eastern Front of World War I as a volunteer of the 27th Royal Prussian Jäger Battalion, in the Finnish Civil War as battalion commander and as a supply officer in the Winter War. During the Continuation War, he commanded an armoured brigade, later division, which had a significant role in the influential Battle of Tali-Ihantala.

== Early life ==
Ernst Ruben Lagus was born on 12 October 1896 in Koski Hl, Grand Duchy of Finland to parents Aleksander Gabriel Lagus and Emma Matilda Bellman. He became involved in the Jäger Movement, where Finnish volunteers received military training in Germany, and followed his brother to Germany in 1915. His brother Olaf had been promoted to major but died in April 1918 under unclear circumstances, possibly in a crime of passion, casting a shadow over Lagus's early life. While in Germany, the Finnish volunteers formed the 27th Royal Prussian Jäger Battalion, fighting for the Imperial German Army on the Eastern Front of World War I. During this time, Lagus saw combat in several battles in the regions of Misa, Gulf of Riga and Lielupe.

Lagus returned to Finland on 25 February 1918, joining the Finnish Civil War on the side of the Whites. As a commander of a battalion and an adjutant of a regiment, he took part in the Battles of Tampere, Kuokkala and Ollila.

== Career in the Finnish Army ==
=== Interwar period (1918–1939) ===
Following the end of the civil war, from 1918 to 1927 Lagus served as a company commander in various units. He was promoted captain in 1919 and major in 1924. In 1927 and 1928, he commanded the 3rd Bicycle Battalion, followed by postings as the commander of a Non-commissioned Officer School from 1928 to 1929 and as the commander of a company of officer cadets in the Finnish Cadet School from 1929 to 1933.

=== Winter War (1939–1940) ===
In 1933, Lagus was made the commander of a supply battalion, later regiment, holding the posting until the start of the Finno-Soviet Winter War in late 1939. During the war, which ended in early 1940, he served as the supply chief for the Army of the Isthmus. Promoted to colonel in 1940, Lagus was given command of the Bicycle Brigade and then the Jäger Brigade during the Interim Peace.

=== Continuation War (1941–1944) ===
After the Winter War, Lagus was ordered to take command of the newly founded 1st Jäger Brigade, Finland's first armoured formation of meaningful size. This unit, trained in an offensive spirit, had the task of developing the Finnish armoured forces, whose combat effectiveness had been poor due to lack of equipment during the Winter War. Lagus maintained strict discipline and actively encouraged a heightened military bearing among his troops.

Lagus and his men were the first Finnish units to cross the pre-Winter War border at Olonets in July 1941. With his armoured troops, composed of conscripts and vehicles captured as war booty in the Winter War, Lagus achieved a breakthrough with his assault across the Tulois (Tuulos) river at the very start of the Continuation War. The powerful armoured brigade advanced at the vanguard all the way to the Svir river in early September 1941, and also participated in the capture of Petrozavodsk, Karhumäki and Poventsa. During this initial offensive phase, Lagus was briefly given command of the 5th Division, but had to relinquish the posting to Ilmari Karhu who was preferred by the Finnish commander-in-chief Marshal Carl Gustav Emil Mannerheim. He was promoted to major general in 1941 and, on 22 July 1941, received the first Mannerheim Cross ever granted.

From 1942 to the end of the Continuation War in 1944, Lagus commanded the Finnish Armoured Division, to which the 1st Jäger Brigade was attached. The division's personnel were trained in the captured city of Äänislinna (Petrozavodsk). Following the start of the Soviet Vyborg–Petrozavodsk offensive in 1944, his division took part in the highly influential Battle of Tali-Ihantala which repulsed the Soviet strategic offensive, paving the way for a Finnish exit from the war.

=== Lapland War (1944–1945) ===
Following the Moscow Armistice which ended the war between Finland and Soviet Union, Lagus led a formation known as Group Lagus during the Lapland War in which the Finns expelled the remaining German forces from Finnish Lapland. From 1945 onwards, Lagus served as the commander of the 2nd Division, before resigning from service in 1947.

== Later years and legacy ==
Following his retirement, Lagus became the chief executive officer of Lohjan Sato Oy, a Finnish limited company which built social housing in the Lohja region. He also took up gardening as a hobby. Lagus died on 15 July 1959 in Lohja.

Lagus was married twice. His first marriage, with Olga Johanna (Jane) Ramsay ran from 1921 to 1927, after which he married Kenny Christine Emilia Gadd in 1935. He had a total of six children across the two marriages.

During his life, Lagus was given several military awards. The most notable of these is the Finnish Mannerheim Cross he received in 1941. His other notable awards include the Finnish Order of the Cross of Liberty and Order of the White Rose, the German Iron Cross (both 1st and 2nd class), and the Swedish Order of the Sword.
