= Lauri Impiö =

Finnish religious leader and politician

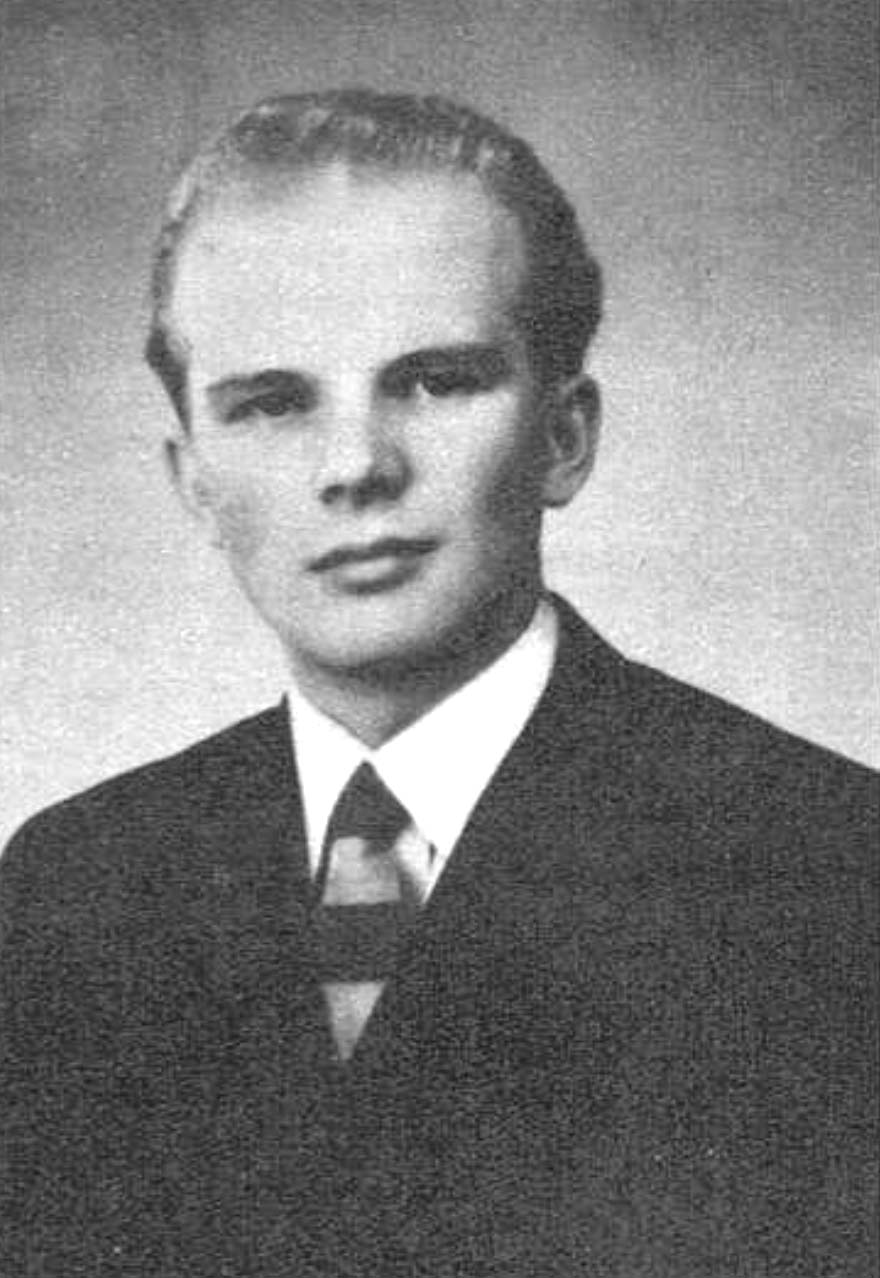
Lauri Impiö

Lauri Johannes Impiö (8 September 1929, in Ranua – 28 January 2006) was a Finnish Lutheran clergyman and politician. He was a member of the Parliament of Finland from 1975 to 1987, representing the National Coalition Party.
