= Ranua =

- Municipality
- Ranuan kunta Ranua kommun
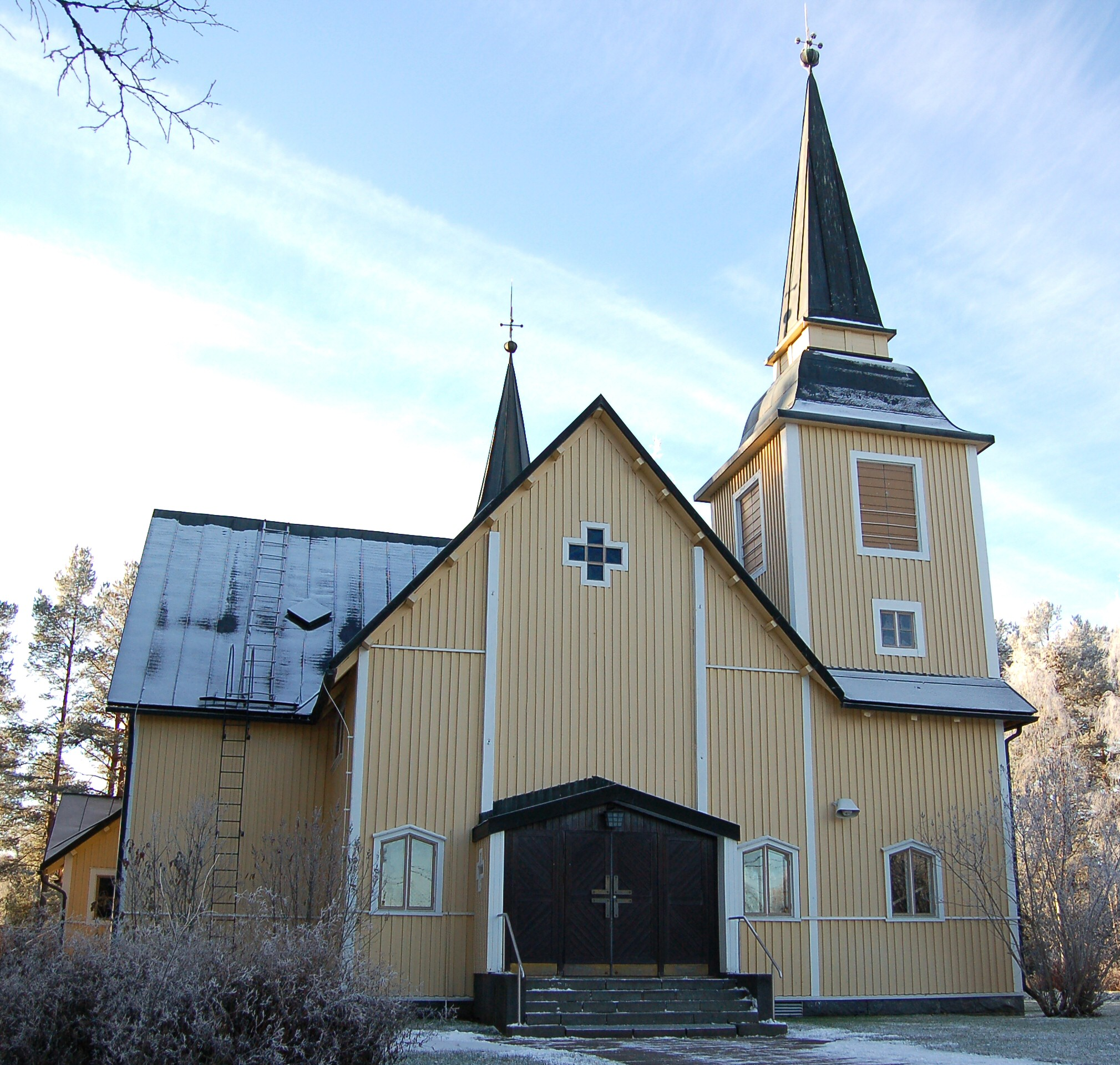
- Ranua Church

- Coat of arms

- Location of Ranua in Finland
- OpenStreetMap Interactive map outlining Ranua.
- Interactive map of Ranua
- Coordinates: 65°56′N 026°31′E
- Country: Finland
- Region: Lapland
- Sub-region: Rovaniemi
- Charter: 1917

Government
  - Municipal manager: Tuomas Aikkila

Area (2018-01-01)
  - Total: 3,694.79 km^{2} (1,426.57 sq mi)
  - Land: 3,454.17 km^{2} (1,333.66 sq mi)
  - Water: 241.09 km^{2} (93.09 sq mi)
  - Rank: 14th largest in Finland

Population (2025-12-31)
  - Total: 3,530
  - Rank: 200th largest in Finland
  - Density: 1.02/km^{2} (2.6/sq mi)

Population by native language
  - Finnish: 97.7% (official)
  - Others: 2.3%

Population by age
  - 0 to 14: 17.5%
  - 15 to 64: 52.8%
  - 65 or older: 29.7%
- Time zone: UTC+02:00 (EET)
  - Summer (DST): UTC+03:00 (EEST)
- Website: www.ranua.fi/en

Ranua is a municipality of Finland. It is located in the southern part of the province of Lapland. The municipality has a population of 3,530 (31 December 2025) and covers an area of 3,694.79 square kilometres (1,426.57 sq mi) of which 241.09 km^{2} (93.09 sq mi) is water. The population density is 1.02 inhabitants per square kilometre (2.6/sq mi). The municipality is unilingually Finnish.

A two-man saw on the municipal coat of arms refers to the local forestry work and the wavy-lined fess to the region's waterways. The coat of arms was designed by Olof Eriksson, and the Ranua Municipal Council approved it at its meeting on June 23, 1959. The Ministry of the Interior confirmed the coat of arms for use on November 23 of the same year.

== Geography ==
Neighbouring municipalities are Ii, Simo, Tervola, Rovaniemi, Posio and Pudasjärvi.

=== Villages ===
Villages within the municipality of Ranua are inclusive of:

- Asmunti
- Hosio
- Impiö
- Kelankylä
- Kortteenperä
- Kuha
- Kuukasjärvi
- Mauru
- Nuupas
- Petäjäjärvi
- Pohjaslahti–Piittisjärvi
- Portimo
- Putkivaara
- Raiskio
- Rovastinaho
- Saariharju
- Saukkojärvi
- Sääskilahti
- Teerivaara
- Telkkälä
- Tolja

=== Nature of Ranua ===
There are 569 lakes in Ranua. The biggest of them are lake Ranuanjärvi and lake Simojärvi. There are also quite many rapids and natural salmon living in the rapids.

== History ==
The formation of Ranua.

The first people arrived in the Ranua region as early as the Stone Age. The first inhabitants of the area were the Sámi, who by the 1600s had to retreat to make way for Finnish hunters from the south. The southern wilderness areas of Ranua, the Siuruanjoki river basin, were occupied by the people of Ii, and the people of Kemi and Simo controlled the surroundings of the Simojoki River. For a long time, the boundaries of the areas were the subject of disputes between hikers.

Wilderness activities gave impetus to the emergence of permanent settlements. However, the progress of settlement was slow – in the 1600s, the only inhabited area in Ranua was probably the area of the village of Kuha on the east side of Lake Ranuanjärvi. It was not until the 1800s that the population began to grow in earnest. In 1910, Ranua had about 1,700 inhabitants. Until the early 1900s, the livelihood of the inhabitants of the area was based on agriculture and animal husbandry, as well as hunting and fishing.

The Ranua area was divided into three municipalities: Pudasjärvi, Simo and Rovaniemi. The long trips to church made the residents fully support the establishment of their own parish. However, the project progressed sluggishly, as there were ambiguities in determining the location of the church and the territorial extent of the parish, among other things. The Ranua parish was finally founded in 1899, and the Ranua church was built in 1911–1914.

The municipality of Ranua was founded in 1917. Areas were annexed to Ranua for the most part from Pudasjärvi, but also from Simo and Rovaniemi. In the years after the municipality gained independence, forest felling and log driving provided plenty of work, and the population of the municipality grew rapidly. In 1920, the population was almost 2,900.

Due to the tight economic situation, the development of the school system was slow. The municipality of Simo established Ranua's first elementary school in the village of Saukkojärvi in 1894. Two years later, the municipality of Pudasjärvi established its own school in the village of Ranua. The first elementary school founded by the municipality of Ranua started in the village of Ylimaa in 1930.

In 1944–1945, the Lapland War caused extensive damage in Ranua, as fierce battles were fought between Finns and Germans in the area. The population had to be evacuated. After the devastation of the war, extensive reconstruction had to be started in Ranua.

After the war, the population of Ranua grew steadily. In 1947, the population was already close to 4,800 inhabitants; 20 years later, in 1967, the limit of 7,000 inhabitants was already exceeded. After this, the population began to decline as urbanisation caused by the change in the economic structure began.

== Tourism ==
One well known attraction is the Ranua Zoo, the northernmost zoo in the world, which has many arctic animals, including the polar bear, which is the mascot of the zoo. Ranua Zoo is the only place where you can see a living polar bear in Finland.

Other notable attractions within the municipality of Ranua are inclusive of the Saukkojärvi Local History and School Museum located in the village of Saukkojärvi, Finland, the Hillamarkkinat, Poro Island, and the Church of Ranua.

== Sister cities ==
- Iwasaki, Japan (since 1990)

== Notable people ==
- Eero Lohi (1927-2023), modern pentathlete
- Lauri Impiö (1929–2006), Lutheran clergyman and politician
- Jouko Kuha (born 1939), long-distance runner
- Taina Impiö (born 1956), cross country skier
- Ilkka Koivula (born 1966), actor
- Kaisa H. Hietala (born 1971), business executive
- Jenna Pirttijärvi (born 1994), ice hockey player
