= Nickel deposits of Finland =

Mine in Finland

The nickel deposits of Finland are found in various locations in Finland. Some other nickel deposits are located in areas that were part of Finland until the 1940s.

== Former Finnish deposits ==
Deposits of nickel occur in the Petsamo area near the Barents Sea. Until the Paris Peace Treaties, 1947, this was the northernmost part of Finland. In 1934 it was estimated that the deposits contained over five million tons of nickel. In 1935, Canadian and French corporations began mining operations there.

The nickel deposits were a lesser known reason for Allied and German interest in the area during World War II, as potentially of great importance for production of arms and munitions. Both the planned Franco-British support of Finland in the Winter War, and German occupation of Denmark and Norway (Operation Weserübung) were partly motivated by control of the nickel mines.

During the period between the Winter War and the German invasion of the Soviet Union in 1941, there were disputes between Finland and the Soviet Union over mining rights in Petsamo. Finland refused to allow the Soviet Union to mine nickel in Petsamo. This was one of the causes of hostility between the Soviet Union and Finland, which led to the Continuation War. As part of the German invasion, troops from Norway occupied the Petsamo region in 1941, securing the nickel supply.

The Continuation War ended in September 1944, with the Moscow armistice of 19 September 1944. Finland ceded Petsamo to the Soviet Union. All subsequent nickel production there has been under Soviet or Russian authority. The Kolosjoki mine ran out of ore in 2020 and Norilsk Nikel closed the smelting works (built 1935) the same year The smeltery, which was built in 1935, was never renovated or upgraded during the Soviet and Russian regime, and Petsamo area is heavily polluted.

== Deposits mined after 1947 ==
After 1947, several small nickel deposits have been mined in other parts of Finland.

- The Stormi mine in Vammala was mined from 1960 to 1969.
- The Kotalahti mine in Leppävirta was mined from 1954 to 1987.
- The Enonkoski mine in Enonkoski was mined from 1984 to 1994.

All of these deposits were mined by Outokumpu Oyj.

- The Hitura mine in Nivala was operational in 2009.
- The Talvivaara mine in Sotkamo was to commence operations in late 2008.

== See also ==
- Geology of Finland
- Ore genesis
- Layered intrusion
