= Karl Brenner =

Karl Brenner may refer to:

- Karl-Heinrich Brenner (1895–1954), German general of the Waffen-SS
- Karl Brenner, character in Alias the Doctor
