= Lothar Debes =

German Waffen-SS commander, SS-Gruppenführer

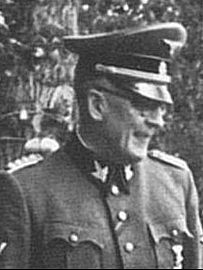
- Born: 21 June 1890
- Died: 14 July 1960 (aged 70)
- Military career
- Allegiance: Nazi Germany
- Branch: Waffen-SS
- Rank: SS-Gruppenführer
- Commands: SS Division Nord; SS Division Frundsberg

Lothar Debes (21 June 1890 – 14 July 1960) was a German SS leader during the Nazi era. He commanded the SS Division Nord and the SS Division Frundsberg during World War II.

== See also ==
- List SS-Gruppenführer

== Sources ==
- Mark C. Yerger, Waffen-SS Commanders: The Army, Corps and Divisional Leaders of a Legend : Augsberger to Kreutz, Atglen: Schiffer Publishing (October 1997). ISBN 0-7643-0356-2, ISBN 978-0-7643-0356-2.

Military offices
Preceded by SS-Standartenführer Michael Lippert	Commander of 10.SS-Panzer-Division Frundsberg; 2 February 1943–12 November 1943	Succeeded by SS-Gruppenführer Karl Fischer von Treuenfeld
Preceded by SS-Obergruppenführer Matthias Kleinheisterkamp	Commander of 6. SS-Gebirgs-Division Nord; 15 December 1943–20 May 1944	Succeeded by SS-Obergruppenführer Friedrich-Wilhelm Krüger
