= Heinz Harmel =

German general (1906–2000)

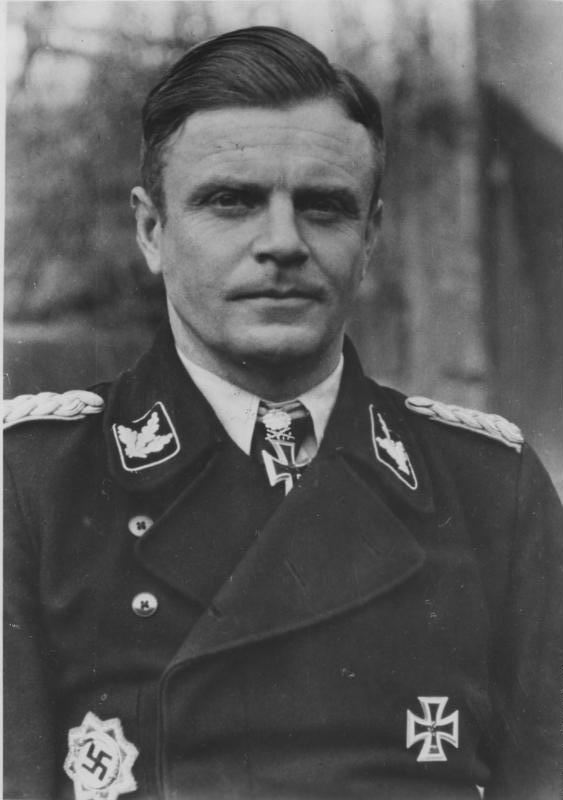
- Harmel in 1944
- Born: 29 June 1906; Metz, German Empire
- Died: 2 September 2000 (aged 94) Krefeld, Germany
- Allegiance: Weimar Republic; Nazi Germany
- Branch: Waffen-SS
- Service years: 1926–1945
- Rank: SS-Brigadeführer and Generalmajor of the Waffen-SS
- Commands: 10th SS Panzer Division Frundsberg
- Conflicts: Operation Market Garden
- Awards: Knight's Cross of the Iron Cross with Oak Leaves and Swords

Heinz Harmel (29 June 1906 – 2 September 2000) was a German SS commander during the Nazi era. He commanded the 10th SS Panzer Division Frundsberg during World War II. Harmel was a recipient of the Knight's Cross of the Iron Cross with Oak Leaves and Swords of Nazi Germany.

== Biography ==
Born in 1906, Harmel volunteered for the SS-Verfügungstruppe (later known as the Waffen-SS) in 1935 and served as a company commander in the SS-Regiment Der Führer, with which he took part in the Battle of France in 1940. In 1941, Harmel took part in the Balkans Campaign and Operation Barbarossa. In December 1941, Harmel took command of SS-Infanterie-Regiment "Deutschland". Harmel participated in the capture of Kharkov on 15 March 1943. Harmel received the Knight's Cross of the Iron Cross on 31 March 1943. On 7 September 1943, he received the Knight's Cross of the Iron Cross with Oak Leaves. In early 1944 after completing a divisional commanders' training course, Harmel took command of the SS Division Frundsberg.

During the summer 1944, the division moved to the Western Front, in Normandy. Harmel had been ordered to break the enemy's lines, to free the German units encircled in Falaise Pocket numbering approximately 125,000 troops of the 7th Army. The operation ended with heavy losses and serious damage. Harmel was then sent to the Netherlands. He fought against the Allied offensive (Operation Market Garden). After the battles around Nijmegen, Harmel received the Knight's Cross of the Iron Cross with Oak Leaves and Swords on 15 December 1944. His division was then transferred to Alsace, where Harmel was ordered to establish a bridgehead to join the Colmar Pocket. After the failure of the December 1944/January 1945 offensive in Alsace, Harmel's division was transferred to the Eastern Front, initially fighting in Pomerania and Brandenburg to hold the Oder Front. The division was subsequently transferred to Heeresgruppe Mitte where in late April it was ordered to counterattack the forces of Marshal Ivan Konev. Harmel refused and was dismissed from command by Field Marshal Schörner. Harmel subsequently commanded an ad hoc battle group formed around the 24th Waffen Mountain Division of the SS, the SS Officer's School at Graz and other smaller units. Harmel surrendered to the Allied forces in Austria and ended up in British captivity. Harmel died in 2000.

== Awards ==
- Iron Cross (1939) 2nd Class (30 May 1940) & 1st Class (1 June 1940)
- German Cross in Gold (29 November 1941)
- Knight's Cross of the Iron Cross with Oak Leaves and Swords
  - Knight's Cross on 31 March 1943 as SS-Obersturmbannführer and commander of SS-Panzergrenadier-Regiment "Deutschland".
  - 296th Oak Leaves on 7 September 1943 as SS-Standartenführer and commander of SS-Panzergrenadier-Regiment "Deutschland"
  - 116th Swords on 15 November 1944 as SS-Brigadeführer and Generalmajor der Waffen SS and commander of 10. SS-Panzer-Division "Frundsberg"

== See also ==
- List SS-Brigadeführer

== Sources ==
- A Bridge Too Far, by Cornelius Ryan (Simon&Schuster, 1974) ISBN 978-8171676361, The Battle of Arnhem in detail, inclusive of the roles of the Waffen-SS Divisions Hohenstaufen and Frundsberg. Based on Cornelius Ryan's extensive interviews of Waffen-SS Generals Willi Bittrich, Heinz Harmel and Walter Harzer (Chapter 3 and 4), the commanding officers on the German side during the battle of Arnhem.
- German Commanders of World War II (2): Waffen-SS, Luftwaffe & Navy (Elite) (v. 2), by Gordon Williamson (Osprey Publishing, 2006) ISBN 978-1841765976.
- Scherzer, Veit (2007). Die Ritterkreuzträger 1939–1945. Die Inhaber des Ritterkreuzes des Eisernen Kreuzes 1939 von Heer, Luftwaffe, Kriegsmarine, Waffen-SS, Volkssturm sowie mit Deutschland verbündeter Streitkräfte nach den Unterlagen des Bundesarchives [The Knight's Cross Bearers 1939–1945 The Holders of the Knight's Cross of the Iron Cross 1939 by Army, Air Force, Navy, Waffen-SS, Volkssturm and Allied Forces with Germany According to the Documents of the Federal Archives] (in German). Jena, Germany: Scherzers Militaer-Verlag. ISBN 978-3-938845-17-2.

Military offices
Preceded by SS-Gruppenführer Karl Fischer von Treuenfeld	Commander of 10.SS-Panzer-Division Frundsberg; 27 April 1944 – 28 April 1945	Succeeded by SS-Obersturmbannführer Franz Roestel
