= 6th SS Mountain Division Nord =

German mountain division

- 6. SS-Gebirgs-Division Nord
- Division insignia
- Active: 1941–1945
- Country: Germany
- Branch: Waffen-SS
- Type: Gebirgsjäger
- Role: Mountain warfare
- Size: Division
- Part of: XXXVI Army Corps; III Corps (Finland); XVIII Mountain Corps; XC Army Corps; LXXXII Army Corps; LXXXIX Army Corps
- Engagements: World War II; Operation Barbarossa; Winter spring campaign of 1944; Lapland War; Siegfried Line campaign; Western Allied invasion of Germany

Commanders
- Notable commanders: Matthias Kleinheisterkamp; Lothar Debes; Karl-Heinrich Brenner

The 6th SS Mountain Division Nord (German: 6. SS-Gebirgs-Division Nord) was a World War II mountain infantry division of the Waffen-SS, the military wing of the German Nazi Party, primarily consisting of ethnic Germans along with some Norwegian and Swiss volunteers. It was the only Waffen-SS division to operate in the Arctic Circle.

It was founded in early 1941 as the SS Battle Group Nord (German: SS-Kampfgruppe Nord) in southern Norway before being upgraded and renamed the SS Division Nord in preparation for Operation Barbarossa. Its original personnel came from Allgemeine-SS paramilitary units and had low combat effectiveness. In the second half of 1941 the division was effectively destroyed by the Red Army during Operation Arctic Fox, when it advanced into Soviet territory alongside the Finnish Army and the Wehrmacht. After taking massive losses in its first operation the Nord Division was entirely rebuilt starting from late 1941.

The SS Division Nord remained in Finland and northern Russia, where most of its personnel were replaced over the course of 1942 and 1943. From that point they consisted of combat veterans and graduates of the Waffen-SS mountain warfare school. With the improvement in its combat capability, the division fought off multiple Soviet attacks. It was also renamed again as the 6th SS Mountain Division Nord. After Finland signed an armistice with the Soviet Union in 1944, the Nord Division broke through lines of Soviet and Finnish troops in a fighting retreat back to Norway. It was then redeployed to the Western Front against the Western Allied invasion of Germany.

Elements of the 6th SS Mountain Division took part in Operation Nordwind in January 1945 along the French–German border, where they took heavy losses in several failed attempts to break through the U.S. Seventh Army in the Vosges mountains to reach Alsace. Afterwards the division was reinforced by poorly trained conscripts and new recruits, though it remained one of the most capable German divisions remaining in Army Group G, defending the Rhineland. In March 1945 it fought near Trier and Koblenz before retreating west of the Rhine, and was encircled by the U.S. 5th and 71st Infantry Divisions near Büdingen. After several days of fighting the Nord Division effectively ceased to exist on 4 April 1945.

== Background and formation ==
After Germany invaded Poland in 1939, the decision was made to expand the Waffen-SS, the front-line combat arm of the SS, which had to recruit from foreign countries because of limitations imposed in Germany by the Wehrmacht. Scandinavians were the first to be recruited into the SS as they were considered to be Aryan and Germanic. Shortly after the German invasion of Norway, Norwegian volunteers were used to form police and security units of the Allgemeine-SS, the general service branch of the Nazi Party militia, becoming known as the Norges-SS.

On 24 February 1941, two SS infantry regiments in German-occupied southern Norway, the 6th and 7th SS-Totenkopf-Standarten, were ordered to form a Kampfgruppe (battle group) ahead of the anticipated German invasion of the Soviet Union, Operation Barbarossa. These regiments consisted of ethnic Germans from annexed Czechoslovakia who had infantry training and were used in paramilitary functions by the Allgemeine-SS in Sudetenland. They included members of the SS-Totenkopfverbände (concentration camp guards). The two regiments were transferred from the Allgemeine-SS to the Waffen-SS to form the Kampfgruppe Nord.

Under the command of SS-Brigadeführer Richard Herrmann, the Kampfgruppe received a full headquarters, including a cartographic section, two pioneer (combat engineer) companies, a reconnaissance battalion, and other support units in March 1941. In April and May, the Kampfgruppe Nord was moved into the Kirkenes region of northern Norway. There they were joined by the 9th SS Infantry Regiment. The unit still lacked training and could not effectively fight with combined arms.

On 17 June 1941, Herrmann was replaced by SS-Brigadeführer Karl-Maria Demelhuber and Kampfgruppe Nord was renamed the SS Division Nord (German: SS-Division Nord), becoming a motorized division. The division insignia was the Hagal rune, part of the system of runes invented by Guido von List. After Finland entered into an agreement with Nazi Germany to participate in Operation Barbarossa against the Soviet Union, the new SS division was moved into north-eastern Finland opposite of the Soviet-occupied Finnish region of Salla. The division was part of the XXXVI Army Corps. By 18 June they completed their deployment to the positions for the invasion near Salla. Demelhuber noted that the division was not combat ready, because most of the troops had no experience in combat and their vehicles had maintenance problems.

== Operation Barbarossa ==
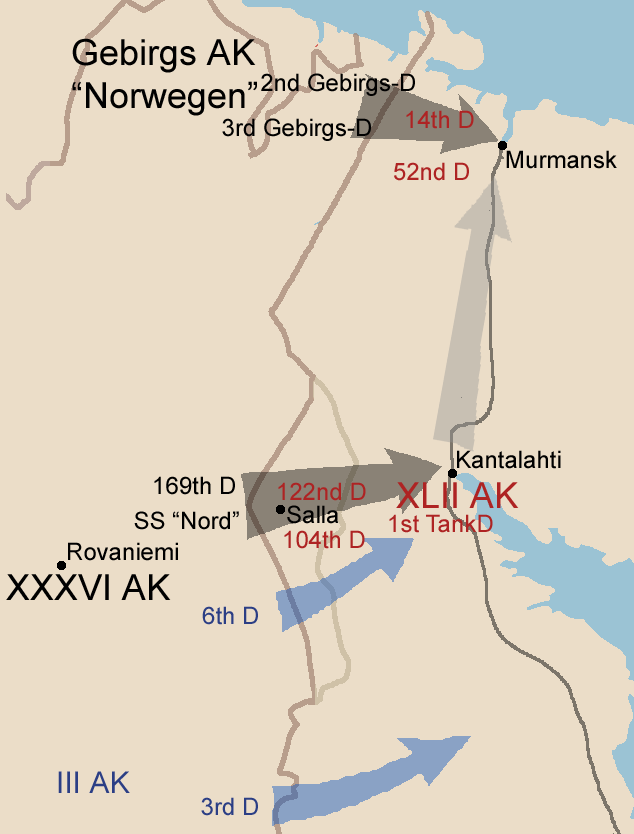
The German-Finnish plan for Operation Arctic Fox.

When Operation Barbarossa began on 22 June 1941, Finland initially chose not to attack the Soviet Union unless it was provoked, and so the German-Finnish invasion of Karelia and the Kola Peninsula did not begin for another week. Soviet aircraft bombed the Finnish side of the border shortly after the start of Barbarossa, causing Finland to enter the war on 25 June. The Eastern Front along the Soviet border with Finland and German-controlled Norway consisted of two halves, with the southern portion of the Finnish border being the responsibility of the Finnish Armed Forces, while the northern Finnish and the Norwegian portions were overseen by the German Army High Command Norway. In the north, the German and Finnish forces had the objective of capturing Murmansk and cutting off the Murmansk railway that connected the vital Arctic Sea port with central Russia.

The SS Division Nord attacked the Soviet border in central Finland (as part of Operation Arctic Fox) on 1 July 1941, alongside the rest of XXXVI Army Corps, which included the 169th Infantry Division. One of the Nord Division's infantry regiments, the 9th, was sent to the most northern sector near the Arctic Sea coast, where it was part of Mountain Corps Norway. The bulk of the division that was in the central region passed through the dense forests and swamps of Salla to attack Soviet positions. In the first week of fighting, the two Nord Division regiments sustained massive losses. They launched three attacks to force the Red Army from its positions but all of them failed. The Soviets then launched an armored counterattack that pushed back the remaining SS troops, who abandoned their positions and fled in panic. This lasted until 8 July, when the 169th Infantry Division attacked from the north and the Finnish 6th Division from the south, threatening the Red Army with a double-envelopment. The successful Finnish and Wehrmacht advance forced the Soviets to withdraw from Salla, though they did not make it to their objective, the Murmansk railway. By the end of August 1941 the SS Division Nord had lost 1,085 dead.

The terrible performance damaged the Nord Division's reputation among Wehrmacht and SS leaders, including Reichsführer-SS Heinrich Himmler and the head of Army Command Norway, Nikolaus von Falkenhorst. After this, the Nord Division was temporarily divided between other units. The 6th SS Infantry Regiment and the Artillery Regiment were sent to the 169th Infantry Division, the 7th SS Infantry Regiment went to the Finnish III Corps, and the 9th Regiment was with Mountain Corps Norway patrolling near the Arctic Sea. Now subordinated to the III Corps, there was tension between the SS Division Nord staff and the Finns, with the former seeing the situation as a humiliation. Despite this, the Nord Division troops learned tactics from the Finns and the other units they were attached to in the continued fighting. In late August and early September, Army Command Norway sent all of the remaining SS troops to III Corps, recreating the division as a unified formation. The Nord Division was also reinforced with the arrival of 700 Waffen-SS troops, who were trained infantrymen, unlike the former paramilitary members of the Allgemeine-SS. In addition, it received three artillery battalions in September. From October to November, SS-Standartenführer Franz Schreiber briefly took command in Demelhuber's place.

The Nord Division had a role in the final offensive of Operation Arctic Fox, in the first two weeks of November 1941. The Finnish III Corps and the Nord Division advanced together in the Loukhsky District in a last attempt to sever the Murmansk railway. Although they made progress and inflicted losses on the Red Army, the SS and Finnish troops also sustained casualties from the strong Soviet resistance. The attack was called off by Finland on 17 November. The Nord Division conducted mopping-up operations and anti-partisan patrols in the forests of Karelia for the rest of November and December 1941.

== Northern Russia and Finland ==
=== 1942–1943 ===
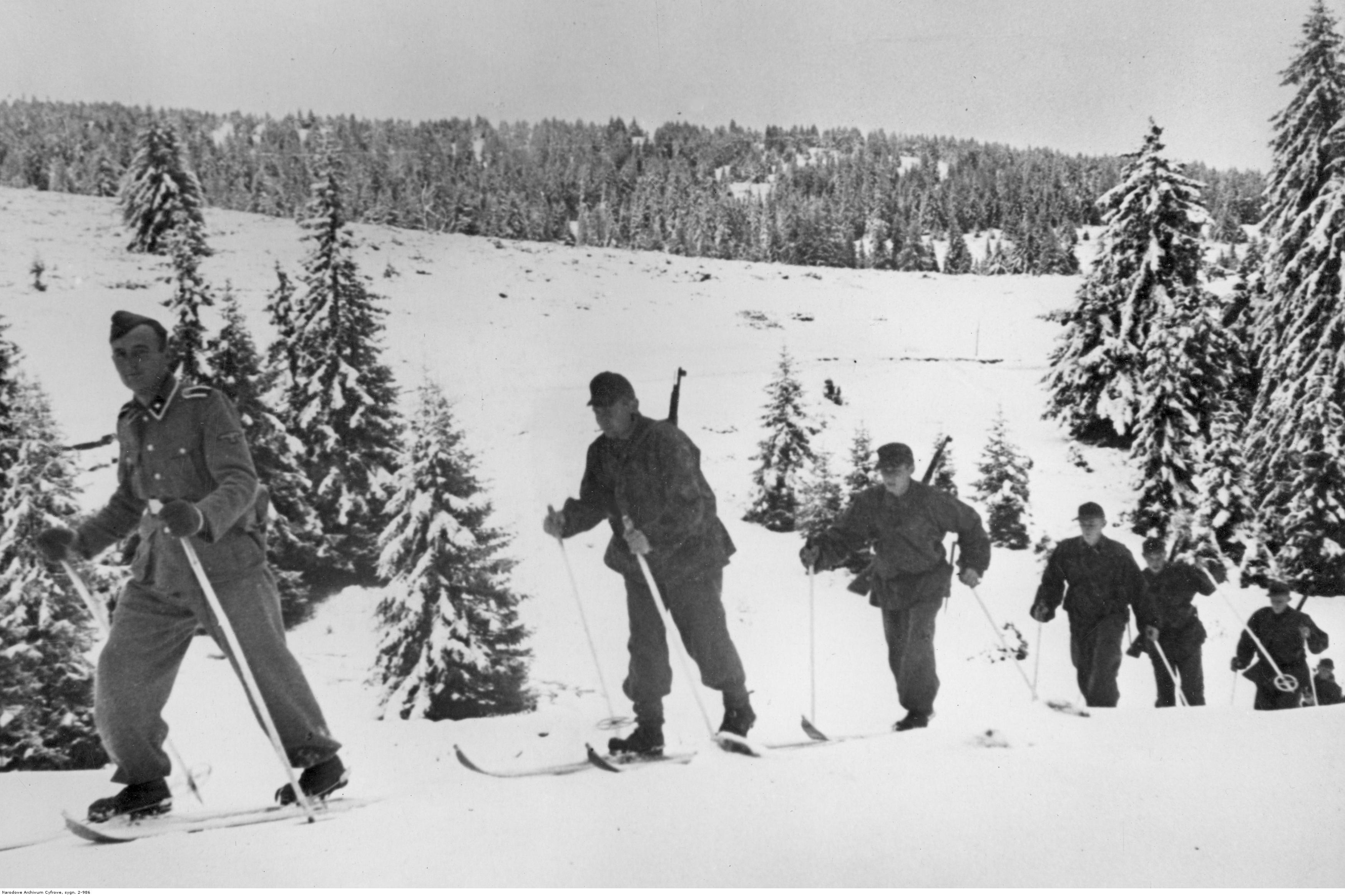
SS-Mountain Division Nord troops on skis in early 1943.

The high casualties taken during Operation Barbarossa led to almost all of the Nord Division's original members being replaced by new reinforcements by January 1942, including by Volksdeutsche Germans from Hungary and Romania. On 20 April 1942, the division received a new commander, SS-Brigadeführer Matthias Kleinheisterkamp, after Franz Schreiber briefly assumed command in the interim from 1 April until his arrival. The division was used to guard nickel mines in Finland and later was planned to take part in another German offensive toward the railway. Before this could happen, on 24 April 1942 the Soviets launched an attack in the sector where SS Division Nord was. The 23rd Guards Rifle Division, the 8th Ski Brigade, and the 80th Independent Brigade made some initial advances before the SS troops counterattacked. The Soviet offensive was fought off and the front line remained static for the rest of 1942.

In the early summer of 1942, the SS Division Nord was renamed SS-Mountain Division Nord (SS-Gebirgs-Division Nord) to solve its supply problems. The infantry and artillery regiments were reformed. This included reducing the number of regiments from three to two, both of which became mountain regiments staffed by experienced personnel. The division also established a training camp for arctic and mountain warfare in Oulu, Finland. The division became part of the Wehrmacht's 20th Mountain Army, and more specifically the XVIII Mountain Corps, which it formed along with the 7th Mountain Division. Under the corps commander, General of Mountain Troops Franz Böhme, the Nord Division and other German units were to hold the sector from the Loukhsky District area to the Arctic Sea coast in the north. The division received more skis and other types of equipment for the Arctic environment over the course of 1942, and a divisional training battalion was established at Berchtesgaden in the German Alps to prepare recruits for fighting in mountain and Arctic environments. The Nord Division was involved in occasional skirmishes with Soviet troops along the front in which they were able to defend their positions, and German commanders began seeing the division as more combat capable. At the start of 1943 the SS-Mountain Division Nord had 560 officers and 20,176 NCOs and soldiers.

In late 1943 Waffen-SS divisions were reorganized and given a number based on seniority, with the unit being renamed the 6th SS Mountain Division Nord. New recruits trained at the Waffen-SS mountain warfare school continued to be sent to the division in late 1943, and around that time they also received two Norwegian SS units, a police company and the volunteer ski company "Norway" (SS-Freiwilligen-Schikompanie-Norwegen). There were also some Swiss volunteers. The SS had plans to expand the 6th Mountain Division into a two-division corps, so it had about 22,000 troops, larger than a normal German mountain division, but this was never implemented because of events in 1944.

=== 1944 ===
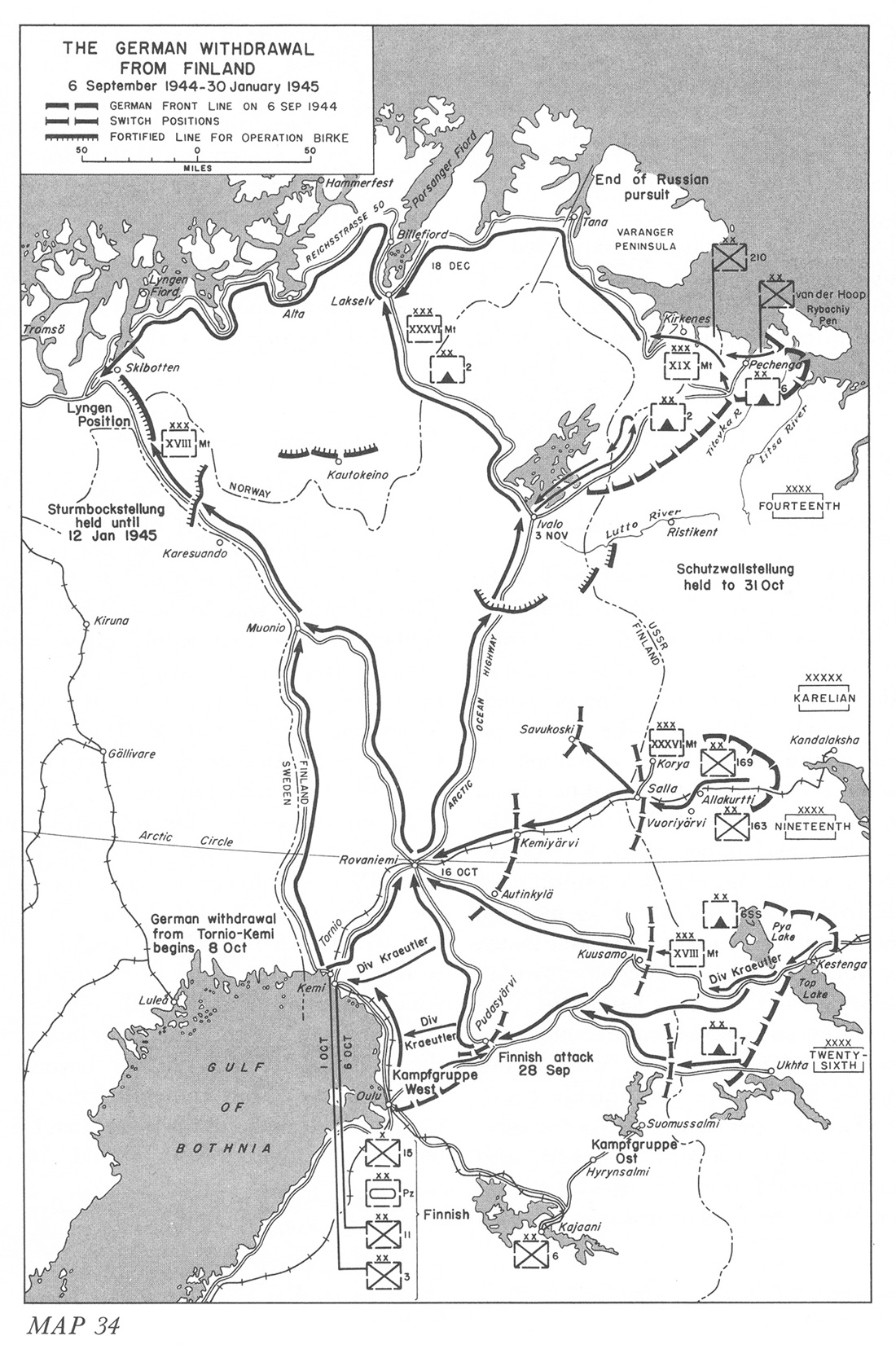
Operation Birke, the German evacuation from Finland.

On 15 January 1944, SS-Gruppenführer Lothar Debes became the 6th SS Mountain Division Nord commander. He was in command when the Soviets began an attack on the division on 7 March 1944, part of the Red Army winter spring campaign of 1944. The main blow of the attack fell on the division's SS Volunteer Ski Battalion "Norway" and the 6th SS Mountain Reconnaissance Battalion. The SS troops were pushed back, but launched a successful counterattack that drove the Soviets out of the area. Later, in May 1944, Debes was relieved of command by SS-Obergruppenführer Friedrich Wilhelm Krüger.

Much further to the south, on 10 June 1944 the Red Army launched an offensive to drive the Finnish Army out of the Karelian isthmus near Leningrad. The massive Soviet attack rapidly pushed back the Finns. The German XVIII Mountain Corps tried to assist them on the northern flank but was also attacked by the Soviets, with three divisions hitting the 6th SS Mountain Division. The Red Army troops broke through the left flank of the Nord Division, causing the corps commander to send his reserve, Ski Battalion 82, and Krüger to send the Nord Division's 6th Rifle Battalion (reserve), led by Gottlieb Renz. Together they were able to push the Soviets out and prevent a possible Soviet encirclement of the division, for which Renz and the 82nd battalion commander were both awarded the Knight's Cross of the Iron Cross. On 23 August 1944, Krüger was assigned to another unit and relinquished command to SS-Standartenführer Gustav Lombard until 1 September, when his replacement arrived, SS-Gruppenführer Karl-Heinrich Brenner. Later that month Finland signed the Moscow Armistice with the Soviet Union, following the successful Red Army offensive in the south, requiring Finland to cut its ties with Germany. The Nord Division staff then received word of the 20th Mountain Army's plans for Operation Birke, the evacuation of all troops from Finland into Norway.

The Nord Division left its positions and passed through central Finland before taking a road along the Swedish border into Norway. As the SS troops withdrew from northern Russia they fought off units of the Soviet 26th Army. The 12th Regiment evacuated first while the 11th was left to cover the retreat of the rest of the division and the entire XVIII Mountain Corps. When the rear-guard battalion of the 11th Regiment was cut off by Soviet troops from the rest of the force, another battalion commander, Günther Degen, led an attack that broke through the Soviet lines and rescued the surrounded troops. He was awarded the Knight's Cross. The 11th Regiment reunited with the rest of the Nord Division, which began the march out of Finland towards Norway in late September 1944.

On 26 October, Finnish troops began attacking the 11th Regiment near Muonio while another Finnish unit blocked the road behind them. The Germans, led by Günther Degen, were able to break through the Finnish encirclement and reached Muonio, and continued the rest of the 320 kilometres (200 miles) into Norway without any more disruptions. In the first week of November 1944 they crossed the Finnish–Norwegian border, and continued marching in subzero temperatures before reaching Gratangen. There they took a ferry to Fauske, from where they marched to the most northern point of the Norwegian railway system to take a train to the southern coast. On 19 December 1944, the Nord Division departed from Norway to Denmark by ship. Karl-Heinrich Brenner was awarded the Knight's Cross of the Iron Cross for commanding the division's successful withdrawal from Finland. The Norwegian ski battalion did not join the rest of the division when it was sent back to Germany, and other units also got reassigned, bringing down its strength to about 15,000 from the previous 22,000.

== Western Front ==
=== Operation Nordwind ===
After arriving in Denmark the 6th SS Mountain Division Nord was immediately sent to reinforce the Western Front, where a German operation known as the Ardennes offensive failed to break through American positions in France in late 1944. On 29 December 1944 the lead elements of the Nord Division arrived near the French–German border by train from Denmark, marching to the villages of Ludwigswinkel and Eppenbrunn. There the SS troops came into contact with stragglers from other German units that fought in the recent battles of the Western Front. The division was to take part in Operation Nordwind, an attack on the U.S. 7th Army of Lieutenant General Alexander Patch in southeastern France, which held a relatively weak position in the Allied line. On 1 January 1945 the offensive commenced, and the lead elements of the Nord Division, known as Kampfgruppe Schreiber after its commander, took part in the attack, subordinated to the 361st Volksgrenadier Division. The Nord Division troops were tasked with capturing the town of Wingen-sur-Moder.

The town was the headquarters of the 117th Cavalry Reconnaissance Squadron from the 14th Armored Division, and the area was reinforced by Task Force from the 70th Infantry Division (United States) Task Force Herren under the command of Brigadier General Thomas W. Herren Assistant Divisional Commander, and a regiment from the 45th Infantry Division. Troops from the 12th SS Mountain Infantry Regiment and the 361st Volksgrenadier Division were prepared to take Wingen-sur-Moder and other towns in the area, initially to break through a mountain pass and allow German forces to enter the Rhine Valley. On 3 January, the SS troops advanced toward the town on their own after the volksgrenadier units failed to capture their objective. The initial attack caught the American troops off guard, they were able to capture the town, taking 350 American prisoners at the 117th Cavalry headquarters. But by 6 January, the U.S. troops had captured positions behind them and cut off the Nord Division men still in Wingen-sur-Moder, who later received orders to abandon the town from the commander of the 361st Volksgrenadier Division. German attacks elsewhere also led to little progress, and offensive operations were temporarily called off. The 12th SS Mountain Infantry Regiment managed to break out of the American encirclement, facing troops from the U.S. 179th and 180th Infantry Regiments, but took heavy losses in the process.

Even after taking losses, the 6th SS Mountain Division was still in a better condition than the 361st Volksgrenadier Division. The remaining divisional units also arrived at the front and rejoined what was left of the 12th Regiment. Fighting continued between the Germans and the Americans in this sector after 11 January, with no German breakthrough initially, and around this time the division was reassigned to the XC Army Corps. But on 15 January the 11th SS Mountain Infantry Regiment counterattacked the advance forces of the 45th Infantry Division after they overran the 256th Volksgrenadier Division. The attack encircled and captured several companies from the U.S. 157th Infantry. After this success, Brenner was ordered to capture Zinswiller on 23 January. This was the last offensive action by the Nord Division before the end of Operation Nordwind, and it failed despite making initial advances. By the end of the operation, the infantry regiments had taken 50% losses, although the other divisional units were intact. The losses were replaced by poorly trained conscripts and volunteers in February 1945.

=== Defense of Germany ===
With the failure of the last German offensive in the West, the 6th SS Mountain Division Nord and the rest of Army Group G was tasked with holding the Rhineland in southwest Germany. At this point it was one of the most capable divisions remaining in Army Group G, though its losses in the offensive and the arrival of new replacements was changing the Nord Division from the experienced mountain infantry unit it had been in Finland. In early March 1945 the division was given new orders to retake the German city of Trier, becoming part of the LXXXII Army Corps. Brenner moved the division headquarters to Holzerath in Rhineland. On 7 March 1945 the Nord infantry crossed the Ruwer river and attacked positions held by the U.S. 94th Infantry Division. They cut off the highway south of Trier, the main American line of communication in the area. However, the Nord Division took significant losses and was ordered to withdraw. One infantry regiment, the 12th, stayed behind while the rest of the division made their way to the section of the Moselle river between Koblenz and Cochem, where it was nominally assigned to the LXXXIX Army Corps, which consisted of several infantry divisions. The U.S. XX Corps and XII Corps began attacking the positions held by the LXXXII and LXXXIX Army Corps, respectively, on 12 March.

The American troops encountered fierce resistance, including from the regiment of the Nord Division that stayed behind with the LXXXII Army Corps, which launched a counterattack that slowed down the 80th Infantry Division. Meanwhile, the Nord reconnaissance battalion reached the Moselle river ahead of the rest of the division, where it fought against American troops on 14 March. The rest of the SS division minus the regiment that stayed behind arrived by 15 March to the Moselle. They were immediately sent into battle against the U.S. 90th Infantry Division, to hold a route eastward to the Rhine for the rest of the corps. The SS troops held out and cut off an American infantry company when they attempted to force their way into the area the Nord Division troops were holding. When the rest of the 6th SS Mountain Division caught up with the recon battalion, they continued to hold out and created a route towards the Rhine from Waldesch as the Americans began taking the rest of the German positions in the Moselle area. On 16 March the LXXXIX Army Corps was ordered to withdraw, and they evacuated from the western side of the Rhine. Koblenz and Trier had both fallen by 17 March, creating a risk of collapse in the German defensive positions. The regiment that remained behind with the LXXXII Corps continued to fight separately from the rest of the Nord Division before dissolving in mid-April 1945.

The rest of the Nord Division, which remained the most intact unit in the LXXXIX Corps, remained in the Rhine valley until it was ordered by Field Marshal Albert Kesselring to move southeast to Wiesbaden shortly before 24 March, in preparation for a counterattack against General George Patton's troops crossing the Rhine near the city. Kesselring then changed his order, sending the 6,000 survivors of the Nord Division eastward to Limburg an der Lahn to hold the river crossing there. The division reached the southern outskirts of Limburg on 26 March, having marched there after they ran out of fuel, but the U.S. 9th Armored Division was already there. On 27 March the American division broke through the line of defense that the Nord troops had established south of Limburg before advancing to the southeast. Having taken heavy losses from the American attack, the Nord Division was down to just 2,000 men, and remained west of Limburg before attempting to reach German lines further east as the Americans overran the surrounding area. By this point in late March 1945 American troops had broken through the German front along the Rhine, cutting off Army Group G in the south from Army Group B to the north, and advanced deeper into Germany. The remnants of some German units were left behind as the American main force advanced, including the Nord Division.

On 30 March, Brenner led those who were left in an attempt to break out of the American encirclement as units of the 5th and 71st Infantry Divisions were tasked with finishing them off. In the early days of April 1945, the SS Mountain Division Nord was in an area near Büdingen, where there was fierce fighting against U.S. troops with the use of Sherman tanks and other captured American weapons. Organized resistance ceased with the surrender of the last divisional units on 3 April. The division was no longer an effective force by 4 April, and formally ceased to exist on 8 May 1945 with the dissolution of all German units. Some members of the division were able to escape eastward from Büdingen, including the commander, Karl-Heinrich Brenner. Later that month a significant number of the survivors were combined with SS officer cadets in Bavaria to form the 38th SS Grenadier Division Nibelungen, though this unit did not finish forming before the defeat of Germany in early May.

== Commanders ==
The following is a list of the division's commanding officers.

- SS-Brigadeführer Richard Herrmann (24 February – 17 June 1941)
- SS-Brigadeführer Karl-Maria Demelhuber (17 June – October 1941)
- SS-Standartenführer Franz Schreiber (October – November 1941)
- SS-Brigadeführer Karl-Maria Demelhuber (November 1941 – 1 April 1942)
- SS-Standartenführer Franz Schreiber (1 April 1942 – 20 April 1942)
- SS-Gruppenführer Matthias Kleinheisterkamp (20 April 1942 – 15 January 1944)
- SS-Gruppenführer Lothar Debes (15 January – 20 May 1944)
- SS-Gruppenführer Friedrich Wilhelm Krüger (20 May – 23 August 1944)
- SS-Standartenführer Gustav Lombard (23 August – 1 September 1944)
- SS-Gruppenführer Karl-Heinrich Brenner (1 September 1944 – 4 April 1945)

== Organization ==
The division had several names during its history.

- SS Battle Group Nord (German: SS-Kampfgruppe Nord) – February to June 1941.
- SS Division Nord (German: SS-Division Nord) – June 1941 to June 1942.
- SS Mountain Division Nord (German: SS-Gebirgs-Division Nord) – June 1942 to October 1943.
- 6th SS Mountain Division Nord (German: 6. SS-Gebirgs-Division Nord) – October 1943 to May 1945.

=== Structure ===
Order of battle 22 April 1941 (as Kampfgruppe Nord)

- 6th SS-Infantry Regiment (3 Battalions & 13, 14th companies)
- 7th SS-Infantry Regiment (3 Battalions & 13, 14th companies)
- Reconnaissance Battalion
- Artillery Regiment (3 Light Battalions)
- Pioneer Companies (2 of)
- Signals Battalion
- Supply Troop
- Divisional Administration
- Medical Service
- Military Police Detachment
- Field Post Office

Order of battle September 1941

- Division Staff
- SS-Infantry Regiment 6 (formerly SS Totenkopf-Standarte 6)
- SS-Infantry Regiment 7 (formerly SS Totenkopf-Standarte 7)
- SS-Gebirgs Artillery Regiment "Nord"
- SS-Panzerjäger (Tank Hunter) Battalion "Nord"
- SS-Reconnaissance Battalion "Nord"
- SS-Flak Battalion "Nord"
- SS-Gebirgs Engineer Battalion "Nord"
- SS-Gebirgs Signal Battalion "Nord"
- SS-Division Supply Commander "Nord"

Order of battle 1942

- Division Staff
- SS-Gebirgsjäger Regiment 6 "Reinhard Heydrich" with three battalions (renamed 11th in 10/43)
- SS-Gebirgsjäger Regiment 7 "Michael Gaißmair" with three battalions (renamed 12th in 10/43)
- SS-Infantry Regiment (motorized) 5 (added in 1944)
- SS-Skijäger Battalion "Norge" (a Norwegian volunteer unit; attached late 43, stayed in Norway)
- SS-Gebirgs Artillery Regiment 6 with four artillery groups
- SS-Werfer Battalion 6 (Mortars)
- SS-Gebirgs Panzerjäger Battalion 6 (Anti-tank cannons)
- SS-Gebirgs Reconnaissance Battalion (motorized) 6
- SS-Flak Battalion 6 (Anti-aircraft artillery)
- SS-Gebirgs Engineer Battalion 6
- SS-Gebirgs Signal Battalion 6
- SS-Division Supply Commander 6
- SS-Feldersatz Battalion 6 (Reserve and training battalion used to prepare new arrivals to fill up depleted units)
- SS-Gebirgs-Kriegsberichter Platoon 6 (Propaganda Platoon)
- SS-Feldgendarmerie Platoon 6 (Military Police)

== Bibliography ==
- Baxter, Ian (2018). The 6th SS Mountain Division Nord at War, 1941–1945. Barnsley: Pen & Sword Books. ISBN 978-1-5267-2139-6.
- MacDonald, Charles B. (1993) [1973]. The Last Offensive. Washington, D.C.: Center of Military History. LCCN 71-183070.
- Mitcham, Samuel W. (2007). German Order of Battle: Panzer, Panzer Grenadier, and Waffen SS Divisions in WWII. Vol. 3. Mechanicsburg: Stackpole Books. ISBN 978-0-8117-3438-7.
- Nafziger, George F. (2001). The German Order of Battle: Waffen SS And Other Units. Da Capo Press. ISBN 978-1-58097-058-7.
- Rusiecki, Stephen M. (2010). In Final Defense of the Reich: The Destruction of the 6th SS Mountain Division Nord. Annapolis: Naval Institute Press. ISBN 978-1-61251-001-9.
- Sotatieteen laitos, ed. (1993). Jatkosodan historia 4 [History of the Continuation War, part 4]. Sotatieteen laitoksen julkaisuja XXV (in Finnish). Vol. 4. Porvoo: Werner Söderström Osakeyhtiö. ISBN 951-0-15330-3.
- Tessin, Georg (1965). Die Landstreitkräfte 6-14. Verbände und Truppen der deutschen Wehrmacht und Waffen-SS im Zweiten Weltkrieg 1939-1945 (in German). Vol. 3 (1st ed.). Frankfurt/Main: E.S. Mittler & Sohn.
- Tucker-Jones, Anthony (2022). Hitler's Armed SS: The Waffen-SS at War, 1939–1945. Barnsley: Pen & Sword Books. ISBN 978-1-3990-0694-1.
- Wilson, Joe (1999). The 761st "Black Panther" Tank Battalion in World War II. Jefferson: McFarland & Company. ISBN 978-0-7864-0667-8.
