= Karl Fischer von Treuenfeld =

German Waffen-SS general (1885–1946)

Karl von Treuenfeld
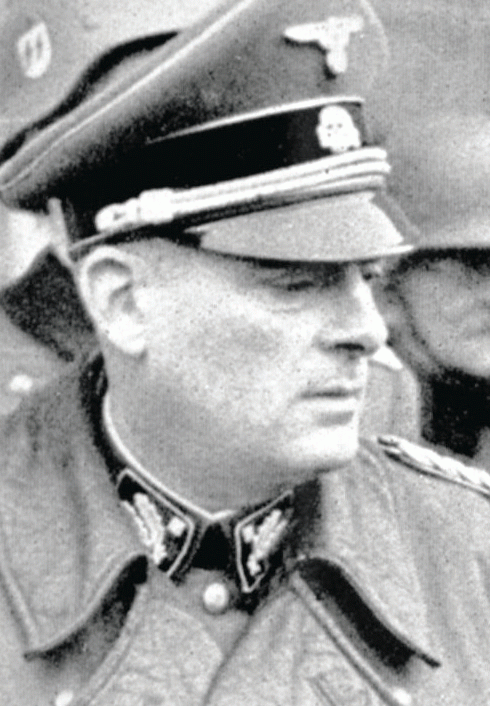
- Treuenfeld, c. 1944–45
- Born: Theodor Friedrich Karl von Treuenfeld; 31 March 1885; Flensburg, Province of Schleswig-Holstein, Kingdom of Prussia, German Empire
- Died: 7 March 1946 (aged 60); Stadtallendorf, Allied-occupied Germany
- Military career
- Allegiance: German Empire; Weimar Republic; Nazi Germany
- Branch: Royal Prussian Army; Reichswehr; Waffen-SS
- Service years: 1903–1918; 1919–1920; 1939–1945
- Rank: Rittmeister; Major; SS-Gruppenführer and Generalleutnant of the Waffen-SS
- Commands: 2 SS Infantry Brigade; 1 SS Infantry Brigade; SS Panzer Division Frundsberg; VI SS Army Corps
- Known for: Leading the assault on the assassins of Reinhard Heydrich
- Conflicts: World War I World War II
- Awards: German Cross in gold Clasp to the Iron Cross, 1st and 2nd class Wound Badge (1939) in gold

Theodor Friedrich Karl von Treuenfeld, as of 20 October 1909 von Fischer-Treuenfeld, as of 27 September 1933 again von Treuenfeld (31 March 1885 – 7 March 1946), was a German military officer who served in the German Imperial Army, the Reichswehr and the Waffen-SS. During the Nazi era he held a number of important staff and field command positions. During the Second World War, he commanded the 2 SS Infantry Brigade and the 1 SS Infantry Brigade, which engaged in the killing of Jews, communists and partisans in the Soviet Union. As the commander of the Waffen-SS in the Protectorate of Bohemia and Moravia, he led the assault that resulted in the deaths of the assassins of SS-Obergruppenführer Reinhard Heydrich. He later commanded the SS Division Frundsberg in combat on the eastern front. After the end of the war, he was taken prisoner and killed himself while in American custody.

== Life ==
=== Early life ===
Karl von Fischer-Treuenfeld was born into the noble Prussian family of Fischer-Treuenfeld and was the second son and youngest child of five of Imperial German Navy officer Kapitän zur See Alwin Felix Friedrich Oskar von Fischer-Treuenfeld (1842–1923) and his wife Emma Friederike, née Harms (1851–1919). In 1898, he entered the Royal Prussian Army cadet corps and graduated in 1903 from the Preußische Hauptkadettenanstalt in Lichterfelde as a Fahnenjunker. He was commissioned as a Leutnant on 18 August 1904 and served with the 4th Guards Artillery Regiment. He transferred to a Hussar regiment (1st Life Hussars), studied at the War Academy until 1914 and then served during the First World War. He served in staff positions and in field commands (the Life Hussars Brigade and the 232nd Infantry Division) on both the western front and the eastern front throughout the war. He was promoted to Rittmeister (25 February 1915) and was twice seriously wounded, earning the Iron Cross, 1st and 2nd class and the Wound Badge in silver. He was transferred to the General staff in December 1915 and later served on the staff of the field army of General Erich Ludendorff. At the end of the war, he remained in a staff posting with the peacetime Reichswehr until leaving the military in March 1920 with the rank of Major.

Fischer-Treuenfeld settled in Hamburg where he became a businessman, and also worked briefly in Great Britain and the United States. He also headed the local Volkische militia. In 1922, he was introduced to Adolf Hitler by Ludendorff, with whom he remained close friends until the general's death in 1937. He made plans to use his militia force to march on Berlin in support of Hitler's Beer Hall Putsch in November 1923. However, this did not come about due to the collapse of Hitler's revolt in Munich. In 1929, Fischer-Treuenfeld's business failed, which he blamed on the Jews, writing in his autobiography: "As a result, the hate of the Jews and Freemasons that caused the economic disaster … caused my business to collapse". At his request, his name was changed back to “von Treuenfeld” by a decision of the Prussian Ministry of the Interior in Berlin on 27 September 1933. From 1933 to 1939, he was employed by an industrial company in Berlin.

=== Career in the SS ===
Treuenfeld rejoined the army reserves in December 1938 but, on 1 May 1939, he left and joined the Schutzstaffel (SS) with the rank of SS-Oberführer (SS number 323,792). Despite his service in the elite paramilitary organisation of the Nazi Party, Treuenfeld never officially joined the Party. From June 1939 to mid-May 1940, Treuenfeld served as the Inspector for SS-Junker Schools in the SS Personnel Main Office at SS headquarters. After 6 months of operational training, he returned as the head of officer training in the newly-formed SS Führungshauptamt (SS Leadership Main Office) where he remained until April 1941, being promoted to SS-Brigadeführer and Generalmajor of the Waffen-SS on 9 November 1940.

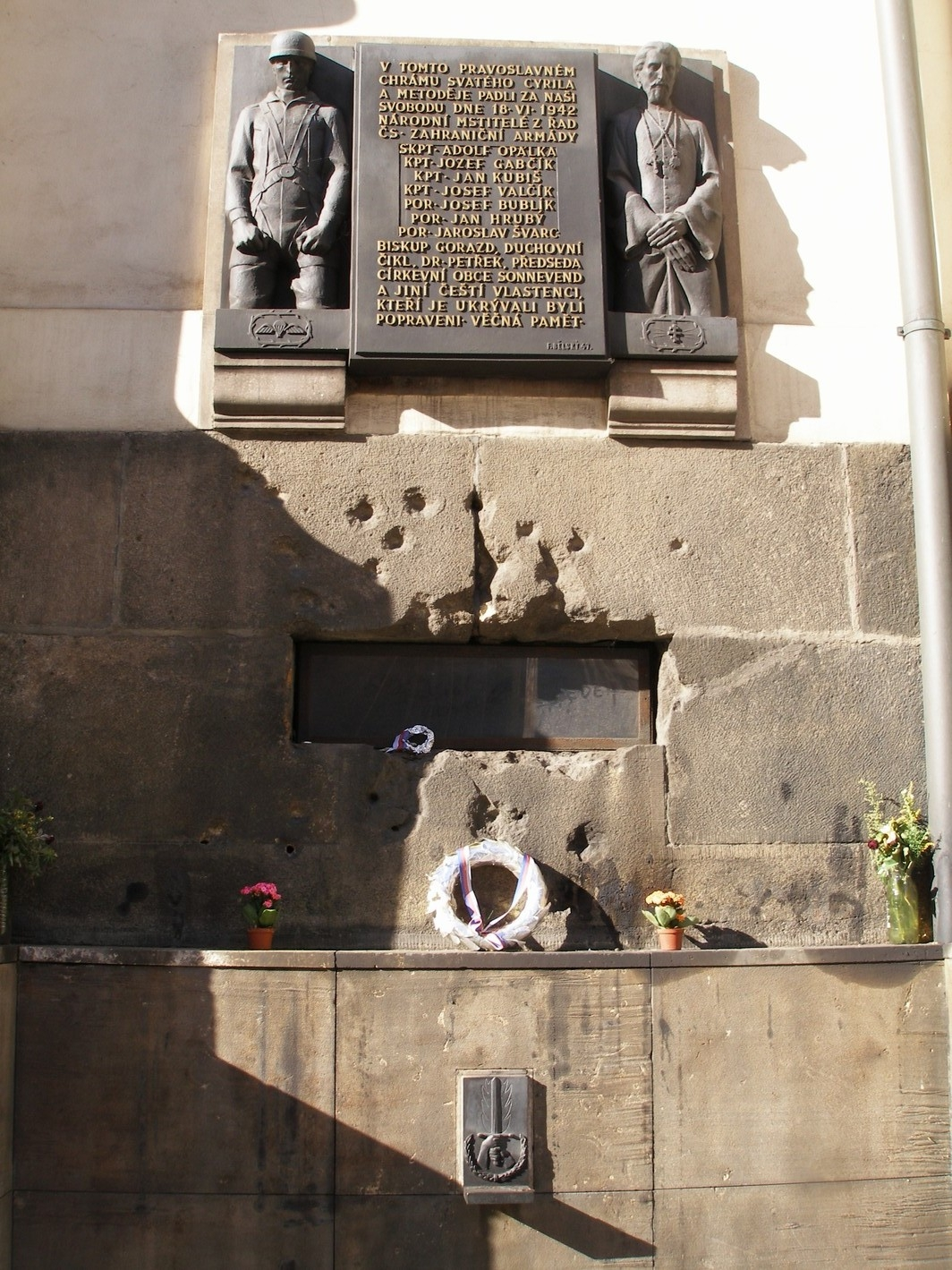
Memorial to Jan Kubiš and Jozef Gabčík at Saints Cyril and Methodius Cathedral in Prague, site of the assault led by Treuenfeld

In April 1941, Treuenfeld was appointed the Befehlshaber (commander) of the Waffen-SS "Northwest" until the command was dissolved at the end of the month. He became the first commander of the 2 SS Infantry Brigade (motorized), which started forming in May 1941 for Operation Barbarossa, and he remained at its head until 5 July 1941 during its early drive into the northern Soviet Union. While in Russia, his units conducted rear-area security operations and the killing of Jews and other groups, including Soviet partisans. On 1 September 1941, Treuenfeld was appointed Befehlshaber of the Waffen-SS for the Protectorate of Bohemia and Moravia, serving under the Deputy Protector, Reinhard Heydrich. After the assassination of Heydrich in Operation Anthropoid on 27 May 1942, the men responsible, Jan Kubiš, Jozef Gabčík and others, were betrayed and trapped in the crypt of Saints Cyril and Methodius Cathedral in Prague. Treuenfeld was in command of the Waffen-SS troops that stormed the church on 18 June 1942, only to find that – after holding out for hours – the defenders had committed suicide. A difference in opinion over tactics between Treuenfeld and the Gestapo led to his replacement.

Treuenfeld returned to the eastern front where he took command of the 1 SS Infantry Brigade (motorized) until the end of the year. He was then appointed as Befehlshaber of the Waffen-SS in Southern Russia and Ukraine in February 1943. On 15 November 1943, he took command of the 10th SS Panzer Division Frundsberg. Promoted to SS-Gruppenführer and Generalleutnant of the Waffen-SS on 30 January 1944, he was relieved of command after receiving another severe wound in the battle of Tarnopol on 22 April 1944.

After recovering, Treuenfeld was appointed Befehlshaber of the Waffen-SS in northern Italy under SS-Obergruppenführer Karl Wolff in June 1944. He then briefly served as the acting commander of VI SS Army Corps (Latvian) in July. From 1 August 1944 to 10 January 1945, he returned to the SS Führungshauptamt as the Inspector of Waffen-SS Panzer troops. Briefly placed into the Führerreserve, by February he was assigned as a formation officer for Replacement Army recruits where he remained until Germany's surrender on 8 May 1945.

== Death ==
Treuenfeld was taken prisoner by American forces at the end of the war, and hanged himself on 7 March 1946 while still in custody at the Steinlager Allendorf prisoner of war camp, after interrogators had threatened to hand him over to the Soviets.

== SS ranks ==
SS ranks
Date	Rank
1 May 1939	SS-Oberführer
9 November 1940	SS-Brigadeführer und Generalmajor der Waffen-SS
30 January 1944	SS-Gruppenführer und Generalleutnant der Waffen-SS

== Awards and decorations ==
- Knight's Cross of the House Order of Hohenzollern with swords
- Iron Cross (1914) 2nd and 1st class
- Wound Badge (1918) in silver
- Knight's Cross 1st class with swords of the Albert Order of Saxony
- Order of the Zähringen Lion 2nd class of Baden
- Military Merit Order of Bavaria, 4th class with swords
- Military Merit Cross of Austria-Hungary, 3rd class with war decoration
- Gallipoli Star
- Honour Cross of the World War 1914/1918
- German Cross in gold
- Clasp to the Iron Cross 2nd and 1st class
- Wound Badge (1939) in gold

== See also ==
- Assassination of Reinhard Heydrich
- List of SS-Gruppenführer

== Sources ==
- Mitcham, Samuel W. Jr. (2007). German Order of Battle: Panzer, Panzer Grenadier, and Waffen SS Divisions in WW II. Vol. 3. Stackpole Books. ISBN 978-0-811-73438-7.
- Lazzero, Ricciotti G. (1982). Le SS italiane. Rizzoli.
- Schiffer Publishing Ltd., ed. (2000). SS Officers List: SS-Standartenführer to SS-Oberstgruppenführer (As of 30 January 1942). Schiffer Military History Publishing. ISBN 0-7643-1061-5.
- Webb, James Jack (2025). Generals and Admirals of the Third Reich: For Country or Fuehrer. Vol. 3: P–Z. Havertown, PA: Casemate Publishers. ISBN 978-1-952-71518-1.
- Yerger, Mark C. (1999). The Waffen-SS Commanders: The Army, Corps and Divisional Leaders of a Legend. Vol. 2 Krüger to Zimmermann. Schiffer Military History. ISBN 978-0-764-30769-0.

Military offices
Preceded by SS-Gruppenführer Lothar Debes	Commander of 10th SS Panzer Division Frundsberg; 15 November 1943 - 27 April 1944	Succeeded by SS-Brigadeführer Heinz Harmel
Preceded by SS-Obergruppenführer Karl Pfeffer-Wildenbruch	Commander of VI SS Army Corps; 21 July 1944 - 25 July 1944	Succeeded by SS-Obergruppenführer Walter Krüger
