= 10th SS Panzer Division Frundsberg =

German armored division

- 10. SS-Panzerdivision "Frundsberg"
- Divisional insignia
- Active: 2 January 1943 – 8 May 1945
- Country: Nazi Germany
- Branch: (Schutzstaffel) Waffen-SS
- Type: Panzer
- Role: Armoured warfare
- Size: Division
- Engagements: World War II; Kamenets–Podolsky pocket; Operation Epsom; Operation Market Garden; Operation Nordwind; Halbe Pocket

Commanders
- Notable commanders: Michael Lippert; Lothar Debes; Karl Fischer von Treuenfeld; Heinz Harmel; Franz Roestel

The 10th SS Panzer Division "Frundsberg" (German: 10. SS-Panzerdivision "Frundsberg") was a German Waffen-SS armoured division during World War II. The division's first battles were in Ukraine in April 1944. Afterwards, the unit was then transferred to the west, where it fought the Allies in France and at Arnhem. The division was moved to Pomerania, then fought south east of Berlin in the Lusatian area until the end of the war.

== History ==
The Division began forming in February 1943, and by June 1943 had received the honor title "Karl der Größe" after the Frankish Carolingian King Charlemagne.

In October 1943 the division was renamed, with the Charlemagne title being given later to the 33rd Waffen Grenadier Division of the SS instead, and received the honor title "Frundsberg" after the 16th-century German commander Georg von Frundsberg. The division was mainly formed from conscripts. It first saw action at Tarnopol in April 1944 and later took part in the relief of the German troops cut off in the Kamenets-Podolsky pocket. It was then sent to Normandy to counter the Allied landings, where, along with the SS Division Hohenstaufen, it took part in fighting against the Allied Operation Epsom.

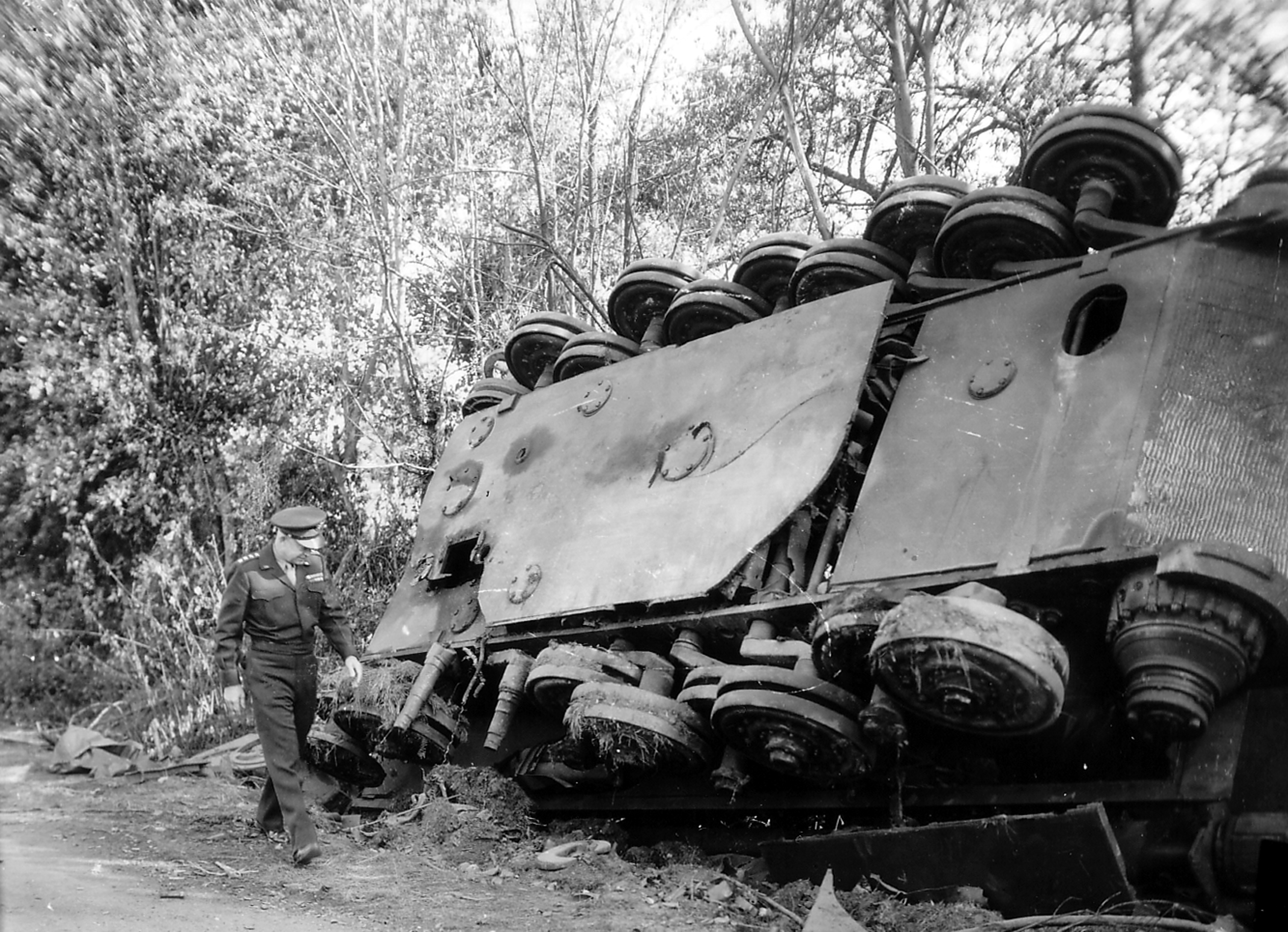
Eisenhower inspecting a German tank in Chambois

The division spent the rest of July defending against British attacks against Hill 112 and Hill 113, most notably during Operation Jupiter. A ridge, one kilometre west of Chêndollé, held by a battalion of the Royal Norfolk Regiment was attacked by the division on the 6th August, but repulsed by the self sacrifice of corporal Sydney Bates VC. In all, after two weeks of this fighting against the British during Operation Bluecoat and the Americans at Domfront the division was like many other units encircled at Falaise. Hitler intended them to take part in the counterattack Operation Lüttich conducted by the II. SS-Panzerkorps on the 7th August but due to the confusion and chaos in the pocket, and the impression given to Günther von Kluge that the division was required to contain the British positions, the attack broke down. SS-Panzer-Grenadier-Regiment 21 struck towards St. Lambert but got repulsed. After that the planned attack of the Frundsberg was abandoned and they were ordered to break out between St. Lambert and Chambois.

The division suffered heavy casualties and retreated into Belgium before being sent to be reconstituted near Arnhem, where it soon fought the Allied airborne troops during Operation Market Garden at Nijmegen, in the Netherlands, when together with the 9th SS Panzer division it constituted the II SS Panzer Corps. The division however suffered heavy losses in the ensuing counter offensive against the Nijmegen salient in early October. After rebuilding, it fought in the Alsace in January 1945. It was then sent to the Eastern Front, where it fought against the Red Army in Pomerania and then Saxony. Encircled in the Halbe Pocket, the division effected a breakout and retreated through Moritzburg, before reaching the area of Teplice in Czechoslovakia, where the division surrendered to the US Army at the end of the war.

== Notable personnel ==
German writer and Nobel laureate Günter Grass was trained as a tank crewman with the SS division at the age of 17 in November 1944. He was wounded in action on 25 April 1945 and captured in a hospital. He did not reveal until 2006 that he had been a member of the Waffen-SS.

Kurt-Siegfried Schrader, who would become known for fighting alongside French Prisoners of War and US Soldiers during the Battle of Castle Itter in the last days of the war, was posted to the division as a Hauptsturmführer in February 1943. Schrader was heavily wounded in the fighting on the Normandy front and during his convalescence was transferred to “Frundsberg”’s Training and Replacement Battalion until February 1945.

== Organisation ==
The organisation structure of this SS formation was as follows:

Designation (English)
- SS Panzer Regiment 10
- SS Panzer Grenadier Regiment 21 (before: SS Pz. Gren. Rgt. 1 "Fundsberg")
- SS Panzer Grenadier Regiment 22 (before: SS Pz. Gren. Rgt. 2 "Fundsberg")
  - SS Panzer Reconnaissance Battalion 10
- SS Panzer Artillery Regiment 10
- SS Motorcycle Riflemen Regiment
  - SS Anti-aircraft Artillery Battalion 10
  - SS Assault Gun Battalion 10
  - SS Anti-tank Battalion 10
  - SS Panzer Engineer Battalion 10
  - SS Panzer Communications Battalion 10
  - SS Division's Supply Troops 10
  - SS Maintenance Battalion 10
  - SS Provisioning Battalion 10
  - SS Medical Battalion 10
  - SS Replacement Battalion 10
Designation (German)
- SS-Panzer-Regiment 10
- SS-Panzer-Grenadier-Regiment 21 (vorher: SS-Pz. Gren. Rgt. 1 "Frundsberg")
- SS-Panzer-Grenadier-Regiment 22 (vorher: SS-Pz. Gren. Rgt. 2 "Frundsberg")
  - SS-Panzer-Aufklärungsabteilung 10
- SS-Panzer-Artillerie-Regiment 10
- SS-Kradschützen-Regiment 10
  - SS-Flak-Abteilung 10
  - SS-Sturmgeschütz-Abteilung 10
  - SS-Panzerjäger-Abteilung 10
  - SS-Panzer-Pionier-Bataillon 10
  - SS-Panzer-Nachrichten-Abteilung 10
  - SS-Divisions-Nachschubtruppe 10
  - SS-Panzer-Instandsetzungsabteilung 10
  - SS-Wirtschaftsbataillon 10
  - SS-Sanitätsbataillon 10
  - SS-Feldersatz-Bataillon 10

== Commanders ==
No.	Portrait	Commander	Took office	Left office	Time in office
1	Michael Lippert	SS-Standartenführer; Michael Lippert (1897–1969)	1 February 1943	15 February 1943	14 days
2	Lothar Debes	SS-Gruppenführer; Lothar Debes (1890–1960)	15 February 1943	15 November 1943	273 days
3	Karl Fischer von Treuenfeld	SS-Gruppenführer; Karl Fischer von Treuenfeld (1885–1946)	15 November 1943	27 April 1944	164 days
4	Heinz Harmel	SS-Brigadeführer; Heinz Harmel (1906–2000)	27 April 1944	28 April 1945	1 year, 1 day
5	Franz Roestel	SS-Obersturmbannführer; Franz Roestel (1902–1974)	28 April 1945	8 May 1945	10 days

== Area of operations ==
- France, (January 1943 – March 1944 on formation)
- Eastern Front, Southern sector (March – April 1944)
- Poland, (April – June 1944)
- France, (June – September 1944)
- Belgium & the Netherlands, (September – October 1944)
- West Germany, (October 1944 – February 1945)
- Northwest Germany, (February – March 1945)
- East Germany and Czechoslovakia, (March – May 1945)
- Surrender and disbandment

== See also ==
- List of Waffen-SS units
- SS Panzer Division order of battle
- List of military units named after people

== Bibliography ==
- Zetterling, Niklas (2019). Normandy 1944: German Military Organization, Combat Power and Organizational Effectiveness (Fully revised ed.). Philadelphia, Pennsylvania: Casemate. ISBN 978-1-61200-816-5.
