= Karl-Heinrich Brenner =

German Waffen-SS general, SS-Gruppenführer and Generalleutnant of Polizei

SS-Gruppenführer Karl-Heinrich Brenner
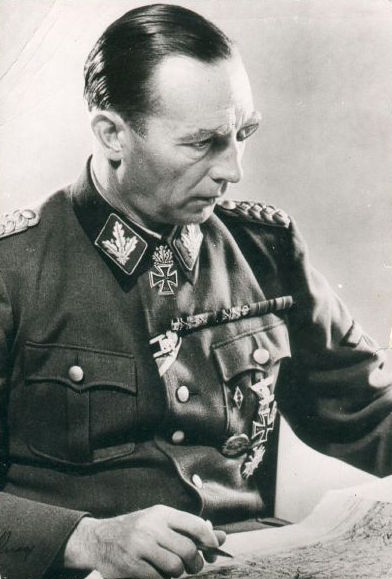
- Born: 1 May 1895; Mannheim, German Empire
- Died: 14 February 1954 (aged 58); Karlsruhe, Baden-Württemberg, West Germany
- Military career
- Allegiance: German Empire; Weimar Republic; Nazi Germany
- Branch: Waffen-SS
- Rank: SS-Gruppenführer and Generalleutnant of the Police
- Commands: SS Division Nord
- Conflicts: World War I World War II
- Awards: Knight's Cross of the Iron Cross

Karl Jakob Heinrich Brenner - also Karl-Heinrich Brenner - (1 May 1895 – 14 February 1954) was a decorated German general of the Waffen-SS who held the rank of SS-Gruppenführer and Generalleutnant of the Police during the Nazi era. He was a recipient of the Knight's Cross of the Iron Cross of Nazi Germany.

== Awards ==
- Knight's Cross of the Iron Cross on 27 December 1944 as SS-Gruppenführer and Generalleutnant of the Police.
- Clasp to the Iron Cross 2nd Class (4 August 1941) & 1st Class (17 August 1941)
- Wound Badge 1939 in Gold (27 September 1941)
- Infantry Assault Badge in Silver (16 May 1944)
- War Merit Cross 2nd Class with Swords (24 July 1940) & 1st Class with Swords (1 September 1942)

== See also ==
- List SS-Gruppenführer

Military offices
Preceded by SS-Brigadeführer Gustav Lombard	Commander of SS Division Nord; September 1944 – March 1945	Succeeded by SS-Standartenführer Franz Schreiber
