= Friedrich-Wilhelm Krüger =

German Nazi, Higher SS and Police Leader in Poland, SS-Obergruppenführer (1894–1945)

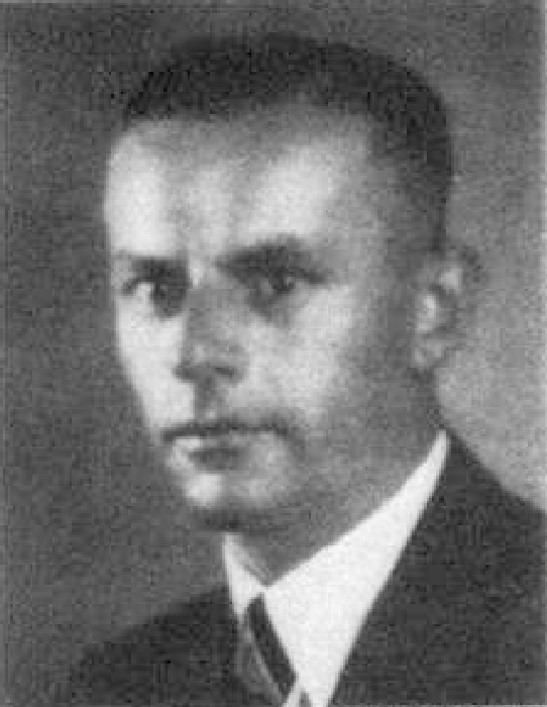

Personal details
- Born: 8 May 1894 Straßburg, German Empire
- Died: 10 May 1945 (aged 51) Eggelsberg, Allied-occupied Austria
- Relatives: Walter Krüger
- Known for: War crimes and crimes against humanity, including establishment of concentration camps and mass murder
- Military career
- Allegiance: German Empire; Nazi Germany
- Branch: Prussian Army; Schutzstaffel; Waffen-SS
- Service years: 1914–1918; 1931–1945
- Rank: Oberleutnant; SS-Obergruppenführer and General of the Waffen-SS
- Commands: Higher SS and Police Leader Ost; SS Division Nord; V SS Mountain Corps
- Awards: Knight's Cross of the Iron Cross; War Merit Cross, 1st class with swords

Friedrich-Wilhelm Krüger (8 May 1894 – 10 May 1945) was a German paramilitary commander in charge of, and personally involved in the progressive annihilation of the Polish nation, its culture, its heritage and its wealth, and never sentenced for his war crimes. Long before the war he was a high-ranking member of the SA and the SS. Between 1939 and 1943 he was the Higher SS and Police Leader in the General Government, giving him command of all police and security forces in German-occupied Poland. In this capacity, he organized and supervised numerous crimes against humanity and had major responsibility for the German genocide of the Polish nation: the extermination of six million Poles (three million of them Polish Jews) and massive destruction, degradation and impoverishment of the Polish state. He took his own life in May 1945.

== Career ==
Krüger was born in 1894 into a military family in Straßburg, Alsace-Lorraine, then part of the German Empire (today, Strasbourg, France). He was the younger brother of Walter Krüger who also became a high-ranking SS officer. He attended the gymnasium in Rastatt and then pursued a military career as a cadet in the military school at Karlsruhe and the military academy at Gross-Lichterfelde. In June 1914, Krüger was commissioned a Leutnant in the Imperial German Army's 25th Royal Prussian Infantry Regiment. During the First World War, he served as a platoon leader, a company commander and the regimental adjutant. He was wounded three times, promoted to Oberleutnant and awarded the Iron Cross, 1st and 2nd class. In August 1919, he joined the Freikorps Lützow, which he left in March 1920. He then entered civilian employment as a clerk to a bookseller and to a publisher until 1922. He got married, went to work for a waste disposal firm from 1924 to 1928 and then became a self-employed businessman.

=== Activities in SA and SS ===
While working at the refuse company, he probably met Kurt Daluege, who was an engineer at the company at that time and who later became SS commander in Berlin and leader of the Ordnungspolizei (order police) or Orpo. The two men soon formed a friendship. On 15 November 1929, Krüger joined the Nazi Party (NSDAP) as member 171,199. On 1 February 1931, he also joined the SS (member number 6,123), which he left in April to transfer to the SA. With the help of Daluege, Krüger began a rapid rise in the SA ranks. He was promoted to SA-Oberführer (31 July 1931) and SA-Gruppenführer (10 September 1931). He commanded the SA-Gruppe Ost, encompassing the Berlin area, from April 1931 to July 1932. In July 1932 he was made leader of the Group Staff in the supreme SA leadership under SA-Stabschef Ernst Röhm, and he served as the SA representative to the Reich Defense Council. In October 1932, he became a member of the State Board for Youth Physical Training.

On 27 June 1933, Krüger was promoted to SA-Obergruppenführer and appointed chief of Ausbildungswesen (Training). Cooperating closely with the Reichswehr, he used his new position to school the SA's recruits (an estimated 250,000) to become unit leaders. Krüger was not caught in the Night of the Long Knives, in which Röhm and many other high-ranking SA members were killed, and it has been speculated that his switch from the SS to the SA was only for pragmatic reasons, especially in the light of Krüger transferring the SA armouries of which he was in charge to the Reichswehr as soon as the purge began.

On 25 January 1935, Krüger re-entered the SS, was given the rank of SS-Obergruppenführer and placed on Reichsführer-SS Heinrich Himmler's personal staff. In February 1936, he was appointed Inspector of Border Guard Units. On 16 May 1938, he was named Inspector of SS Mounted Units.

Throughout these years, Krüger also pursued a political career within the Nazi Party. At the July 1932 election, he won a seat in the Reichstag from electoral constituency 5 (Frankfurt an der Oder) and, on 10 July 1933, he was made a member of the Prussian State Council. He would hold these seats until the fall of the Nazi regime. Also he served a term as a District Councillor (Rattsherr) in Berlin from 1933 through 1935. In July 1937, he was given a seat on the People's Court and he was appointed the Reich Supreme Authority for Equestrian Sports in January 1939.

=== Crimes in Poland ===
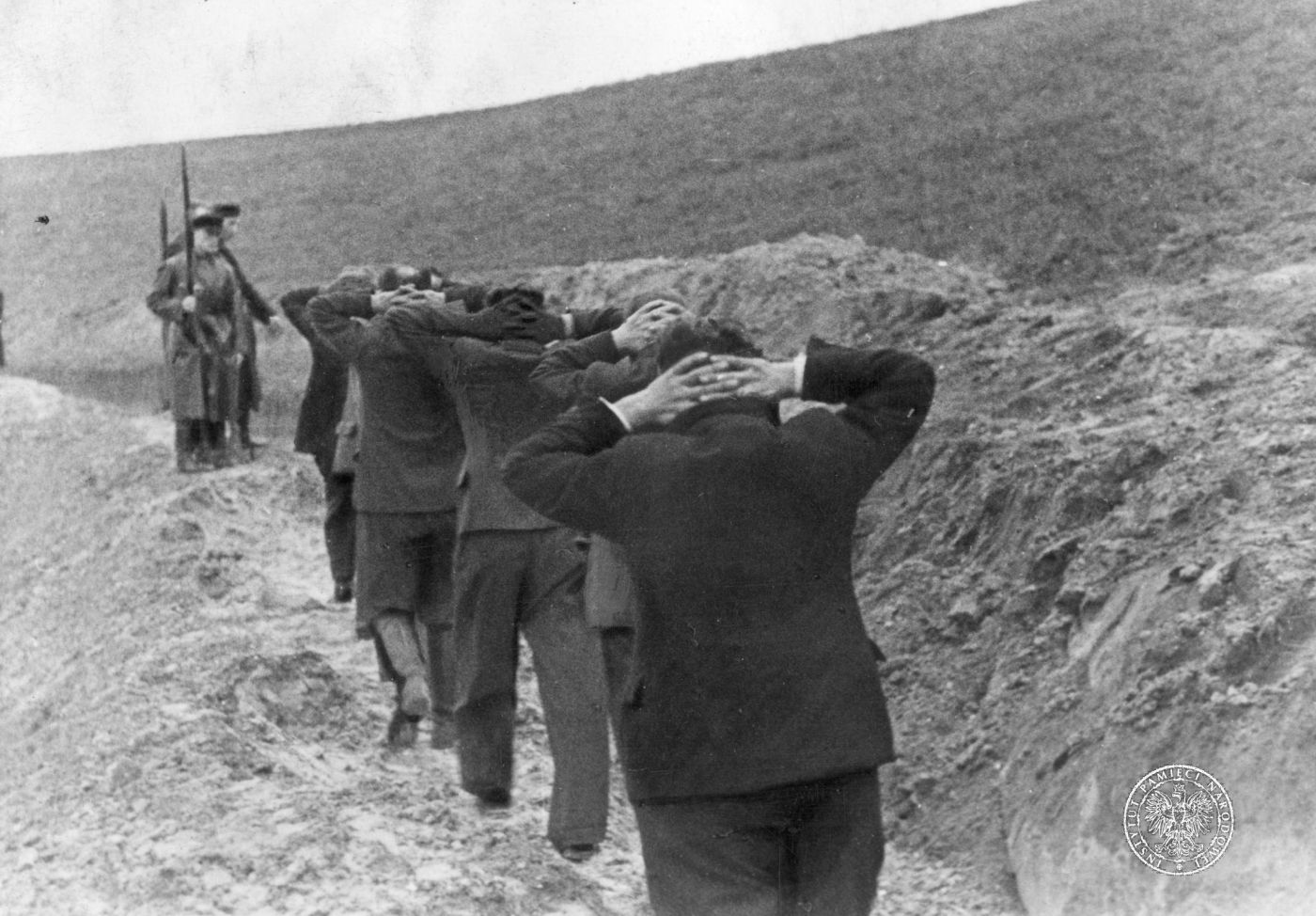
Selbstschutz shooters escorting Polish teachers to the Valley of Death, Bydgoszcz

On 4 October 1939, Himmler appointed Krüger as the Higher SS and Police Leader (Höherer SS- und Polizeiführer, HSSPF) to the German military administration in Łódź. This was rapidly followed on 26 October by his formal appointment as HSSPF "Ost" to the part of German-occupied Poland organized into the General Government, with headquarters in Kraków. Krüger thus held the highest police and security post in occupied Poland.

During the first months of the war in Poland, he was one of the coordinators of Action AB – the mass murder by shooting of Polish intelligentsia, which was performed by Orpo or ethnic Germans (Volksdeutscher Selbstschutz). The victims were mainly University lecturers, retired military officers, high-rank policemen, managing staff of the Polish State Railways, journalists, businessmen, landowners, notable Catholic priests, internationally known sportsmen (vide Janusz Kusociński), judges, teachers, social workers, senior administrative officials or other members of Polish intellectual elite.

Already in November 1939, Krüger had fulfilled Hitler's personal order, and 184 professors of Jagiellonian University were arrested in the Sonderaktion Krakau action and deported on a cattle train to Sachsenhausen concentration camp; fewer than 50 of the professors survived the war.

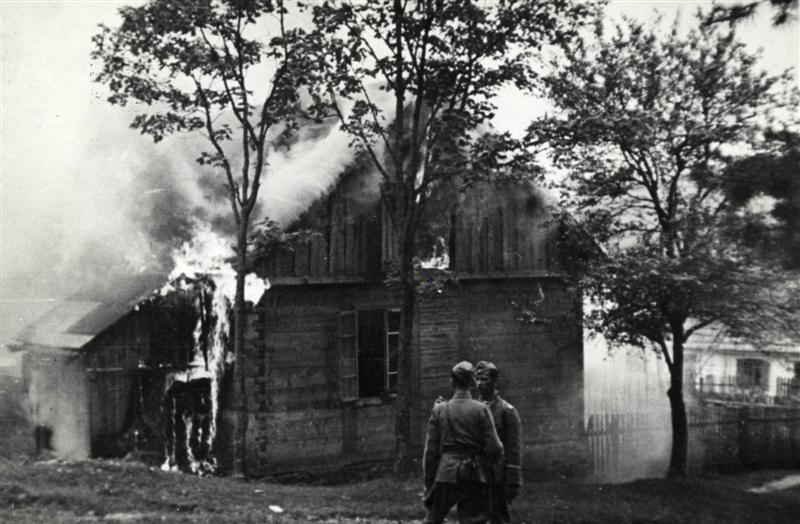
Pacification of Michniów, the village's 204 inhabitants: 102 men, 54 women and 48 children, were massacred by Order Police battalions on 12–13 July 1943. The youngest victim was a nine-day-old boy, thrown by a German soldier into a burning barn

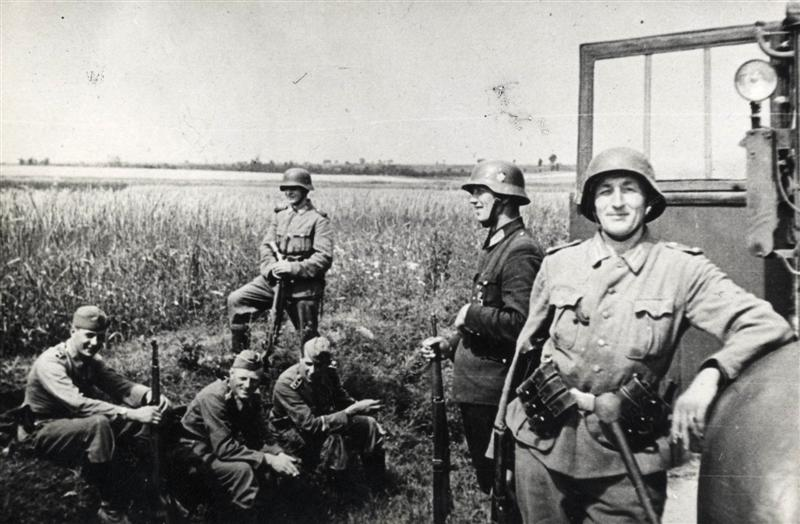
German policemen on the way to quell Michniów

From the very beginning he introduced the terror on a large scale. For every killed German in General Government by Home Army, ten random Polish civilians were shot. Regular arrests of Polish inhabitants of Warsaw, during the street Razzia (Polish: łapanka) and transporting them to the Third Reich to do slave labor for German industry (for among others: Krupp, Audi, IG Farben, Porsche, Volkswagen...), or straight to concentration camps, were organized on his orders.

The deportation to the concentration camp was practically equal to the death sentence. One of the men from units subordinated to Krüger: SS-Hauptsturmführer (captain) Karl Fritzsch, nota bene the deputy (Schutzhaftlagerführer) Auschwitz commander, once said to a new transport of Polish prisoners:

You came here not to a holiday in Zoppot, but to the German concentration camp, from which the only way out is through a chimney. If you do not accept that, you can walk straight onto the wires. If there are Jews in the transport, they have no right to live longer than two weeks, Catholic priests – a month, the rest – three months. (...) To us, all of you are not human beings, but a pile of dung (...). For such enemies of the Third Reich as you, the Germans will have no respect and no mercy. You will forget about your wives, children and families. Here, you will all die like dogs.

The collective responsibility was the new law introduced by SS. If someone in the family committed an act against the new rules (for example: failure to comply with the curfew), all the members of the family were sent to concentration camp. In the case, when a serious disobedience was committed by a farmer, the whole village was under process of pacification (mass execution by burning).

Due to harsh "politics" of the occupiers, the shortage of the food and medications in the cities and towns was extreme. The Poles were starving (average food allocation amounted to 2,600 calories for Germans, 700 for Poles and 400 for Jews). The worst situation was in the ghettos, where the mortality was much higher than among "free" Poles. Farmers in GG were obliged to deliver draconian amount of grain, meat, milk and potatoes, which were sent straight to Germany. No pay was given to the victims. Just in the year 1942–1943 around 633,000 tons of the grain were confiscated from Polish villages. In the Autumn period of 1944 nearly 388,000 tons of potatoes were stolen. The contingents were taken by force and in the whole process military or para-military forces were used, acting on orders of local SS or police commander. In the case of refusal to deliver on time, severe punishments like beatings or arrests were applied. Some of them were resulting in sending to a concentration camps. All sorts of repressions were introduced, including the death penalty (without formal accusation or a lawful trial).

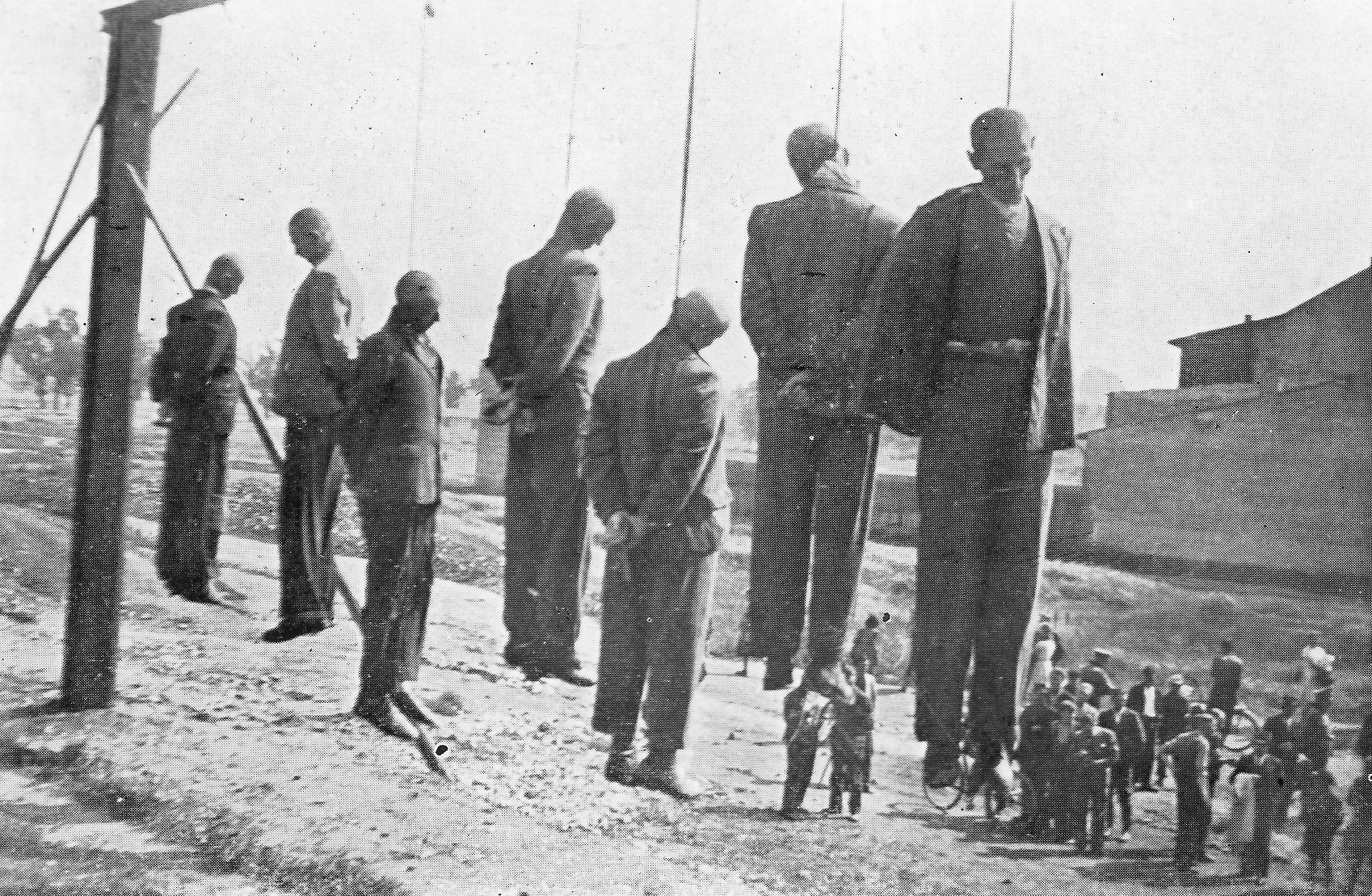
Poles hanged by the German authorities, Kraków, 26 June 1942

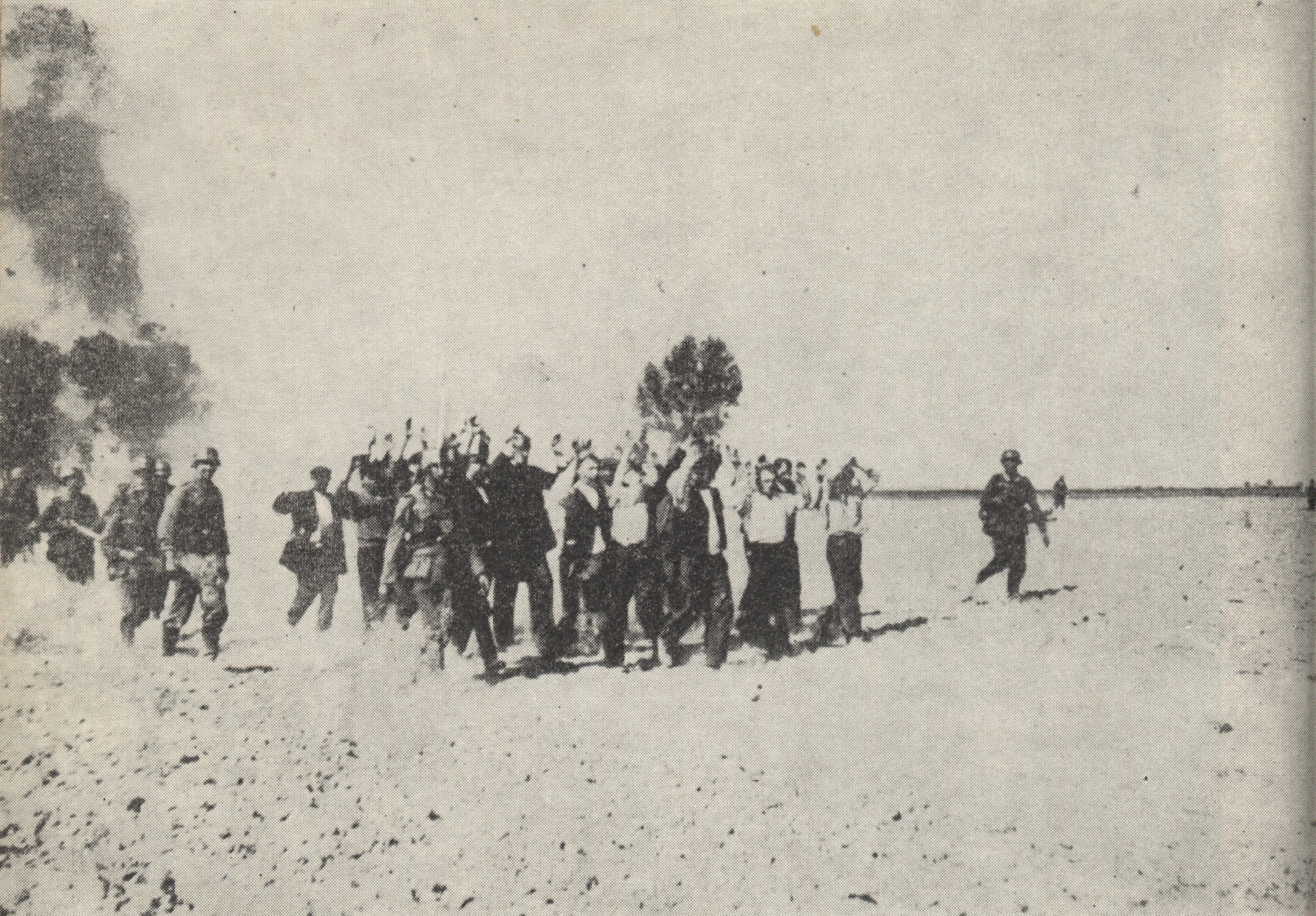
Wehrmacht marching Polish civilians to execution. In the background a burning village, September 1939

To terrorize the population – on SS commanders' orders – public executions by shooting or hanging were conducted.

The systematic process of kidnapping around 200,000 children from Polish families for further Germanisation was also Krüger's domain.

People disabled mentally or with Down syndrome were secretly killed by the authorities (mainly by Sicherheitspolizei). Later on, the gas vans were invented by German doctor of chemistry and SS-Untersturmführer August Becker (not subordinated to Krüger), to make the whole process faster, more discreet and taking the burden of participating in a mass shootings from ordinary soldiers.

Krüger supervised the action of destroying Polish historical buildings (without military significance), cultural sites and in general Polish culture – both by stealing the art works or – if they were related to Polish history – burning some of them on the spot (vide: medieval synagogue). More than 500,000 of Polish and international (paintings by da Vinci, Raphael or Rembrandt) piece of arts were stolen. Most of them never come back to Poland after the war. Some of the goods – crucial to Polish cultural heritage like paintings: Battle of Grunwald or Prussian Homage, were hidden in a local farms. If they were seized by the occupiers, they would be destroyed as anti-German. Policies aimed at cultural genocide resulted in the deaths of thousands of scholars and artists, and the theft and destruction of innumerable cultural artifacts.

All Polish theatres were disbanded, likewise all universities were shut, and the secondary schools were teaching only basics. Lessons of history, geography and the Polish literature ceased to be performed. The primary education in the countryside was not allowed during the next five years, leaving – in 1945 – a couple of million teenagers, barely able to write and read. In Galicia for every book given to the German authorities, a bottle of alcohol was the pay (one of the assumptions of the Generalplan Ost). The plan was originating from Otto von Bismarck's operations against – among others – Poles, mainly in Provinz Posen (Greater Poland) in the 19th century.

Once Bismarck wrote to his sister in 1861:

"Hammer the Poles until they despair of living [...] I have all the sympathy in the world for their situation, but if we want to exist we have no choice but to wipe them out: wolves are only what God made them, but we shoot them all the same when we can get at them."

Reichsführer SS expressed the German doctrine against Untermenschen by these words:

The sole goal of this schooling is to teach them simple arithmetic, nothing above the number 500; writing one's name; and the doctrine that it is divine law to obey the Germans. I do not think that reading is desirable.

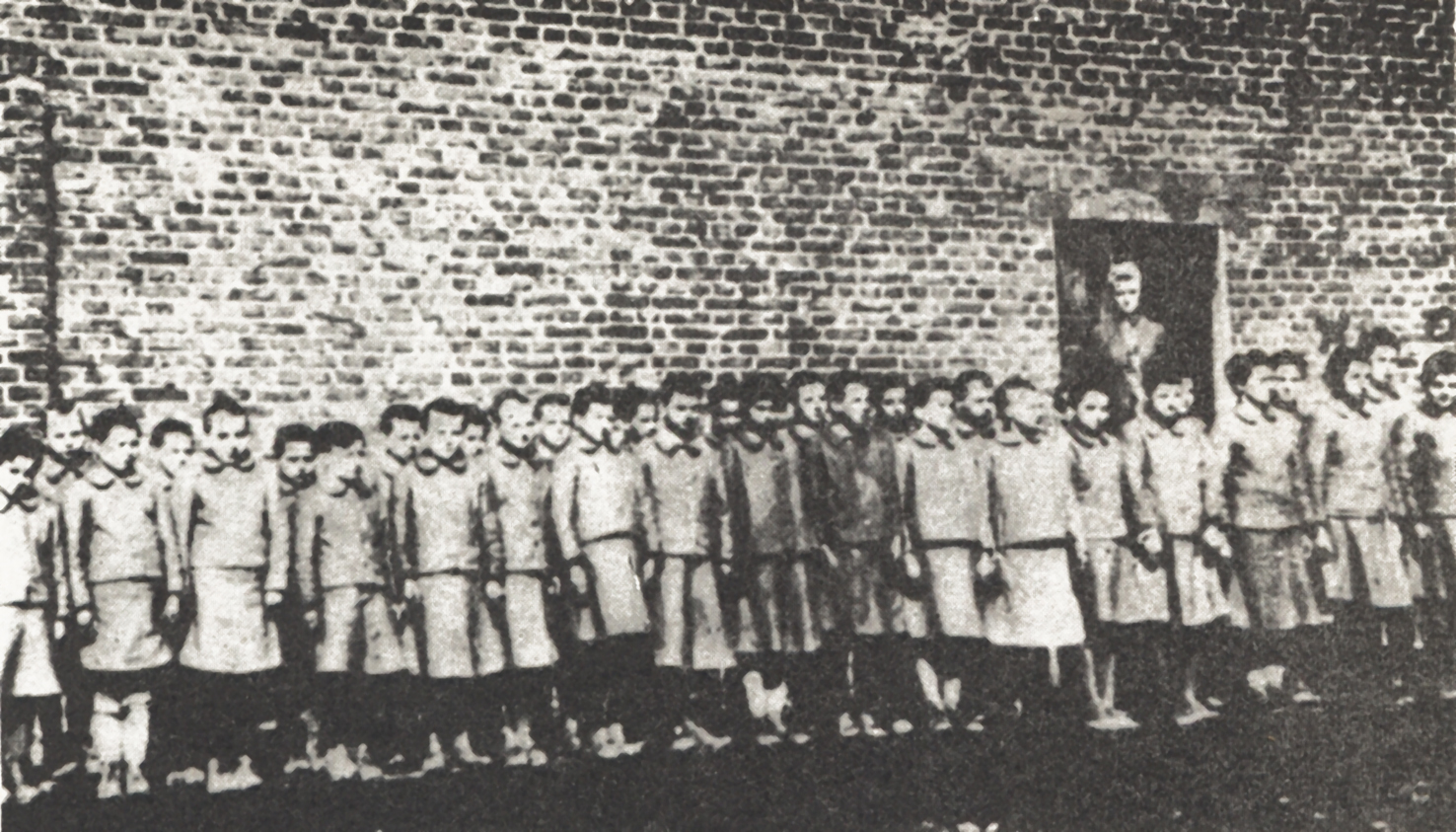
Girls from – among others – Zamojszczyzna at concentration camp for children near Zgierz (1942–1943)

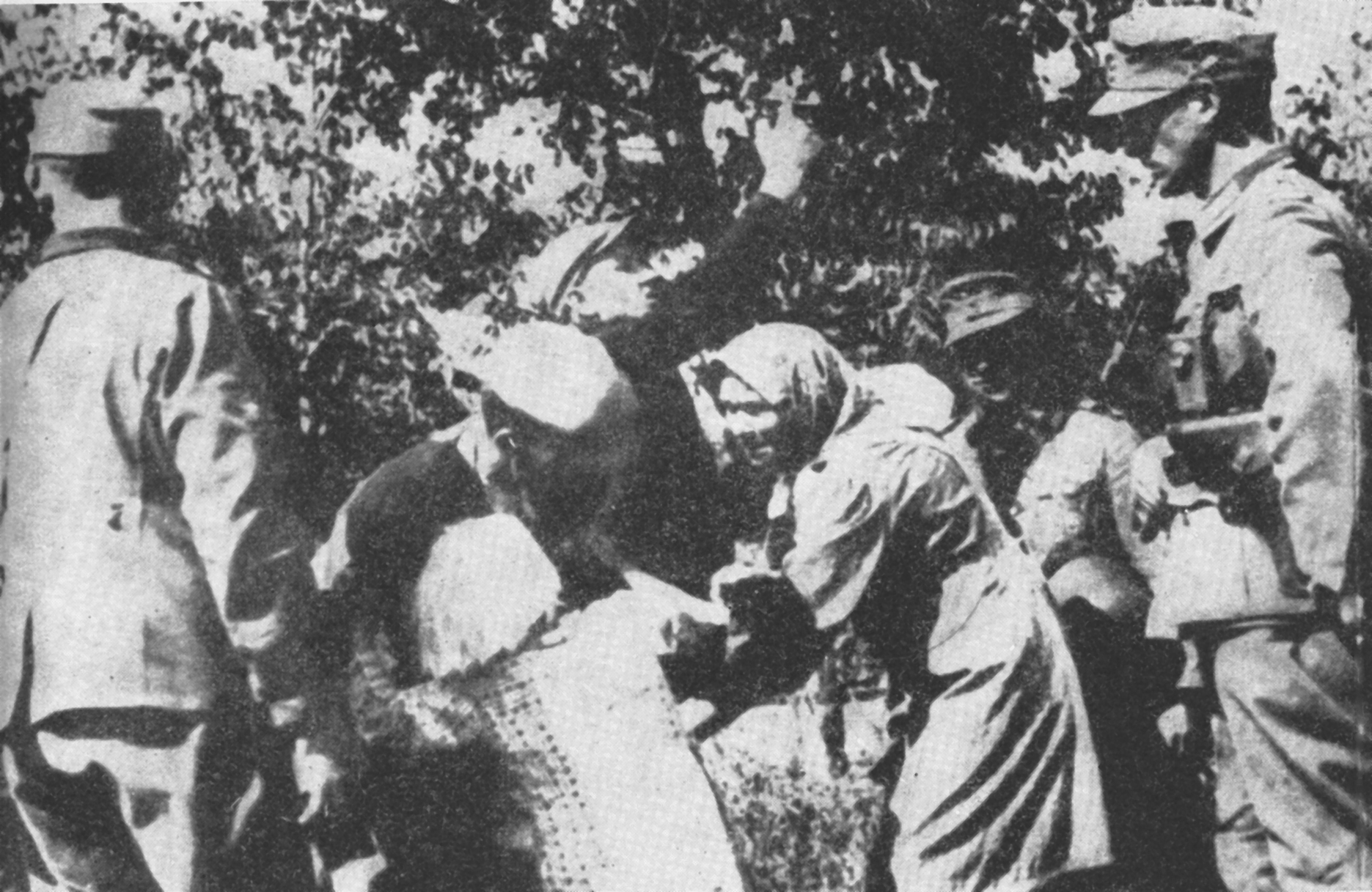
Kidnapping of Polish children at Zamość

As the highest commander in charge he looked after the execution of Operation Harvest Festival in district of Lublin, when during one day in November 1943 SS, Order Police (101st Police Battalion from Hamburg volunteered for this operation) and the Ukrainian Sonderdienst shot to death in mass killings more than 83,000 Jews. Krüger's men, hand-in-hand with Order Police battalions, Einsatzgruppen and Wehrmacht were conducting during a few years time, the genocide program of quelling guerrilla activity, so-called: "anti-partisan" fighting in the General Government. During these operations, which meant to be against Polish "bandits", as the Germans called partisans, the murders of women and children were carried out on a daily basis. For a help given to the partisans by local farmers and their families, the entire villages were burnt to the ashes with all inhabitants (so-called pacification action).

Such "disciplinary" campaigns were a commonplace in Poland under German occupation – more than 300 Polish villages were destroyed (within the borders after 1945). In the most of cases, before the fire was set to the village, all the peasants were gathered in the biggest village building and burnt alive. Earlier, several grenades were thrown into the crowd.

Among other deeds committed by Krüger were: responsibility for eliminating rebellions in the extermination camps, providing victims for the medical experiments typically resulting in the death or permanent disability, setting up forced labour camps, the employment of police and SS in the deportations of Jews from ghettos in General Government to extermination camps.

He was in charge of driving out (ethnic cleansing) of over 116,000 Polish farmers (30 thousands of them were children) from the area around Zamość, known as Aktion Zamosc. Most of the children were sent to concentrations camps and to labor camps. Blond and sufficiently young were being sent to the III Reich to be Germanised, or work as slaves for German industry or farms. Only 800 children of Zamość were successfully reclaimed after the war.

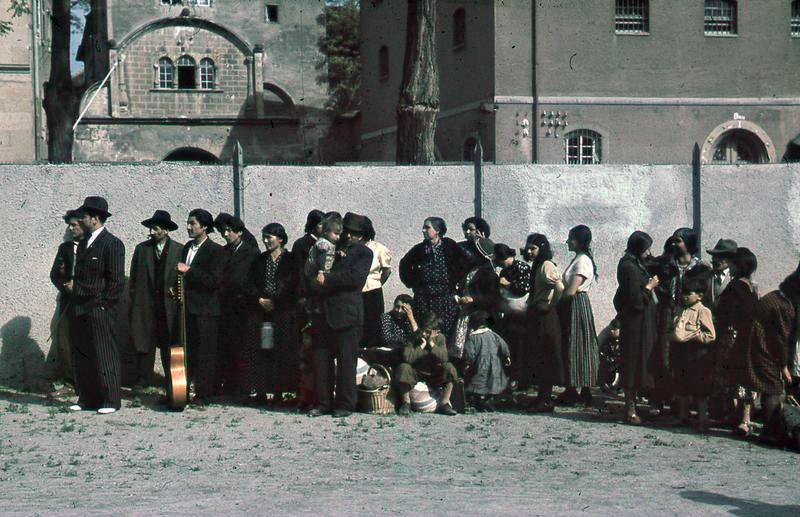
Deportations of German Romani from Baden-Württemberg to the east (mainly to the ghettos, labor or extermination camps in GG)

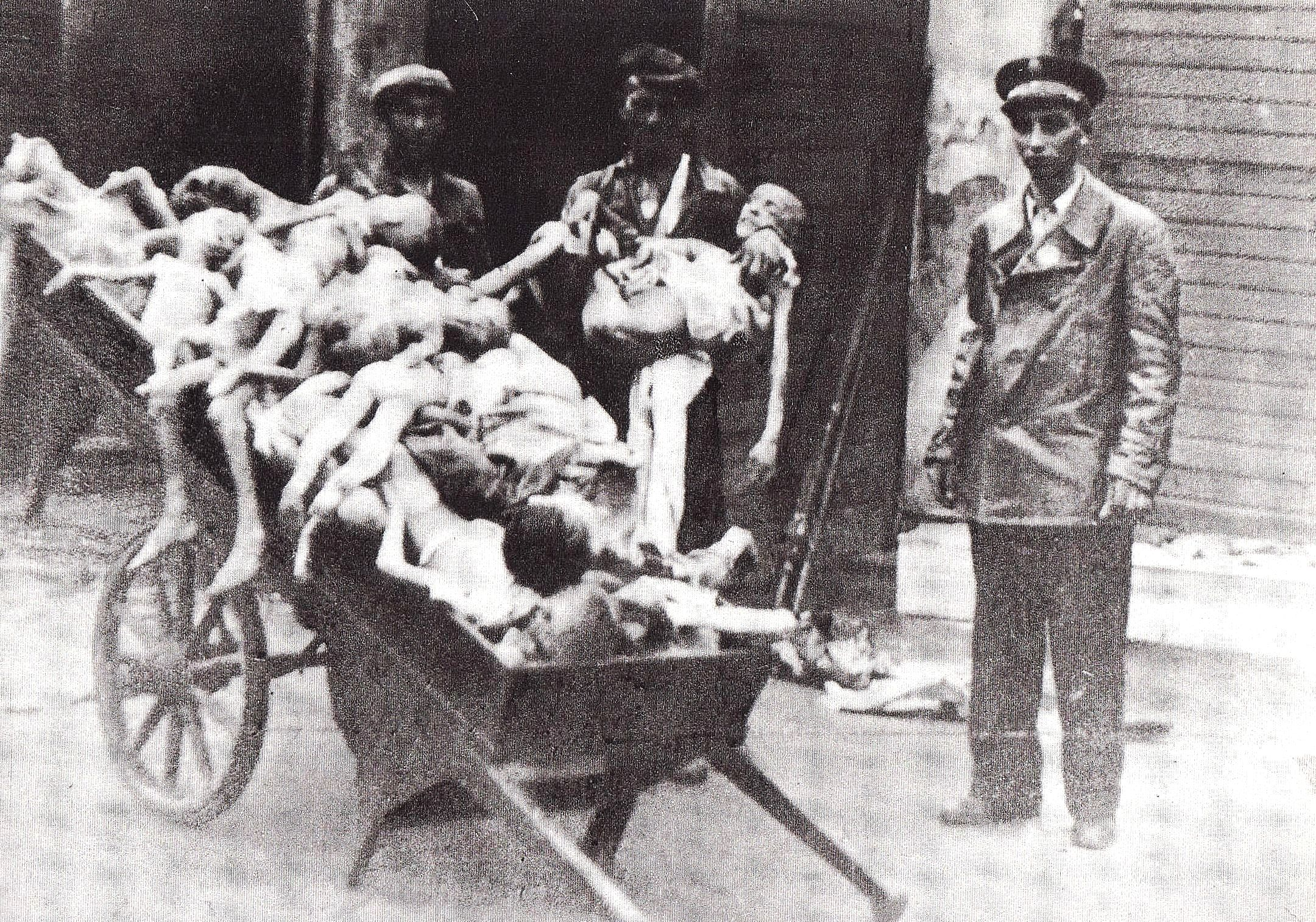
More than 10,000 Jewish children died of starvation, cold or disease in the Warsaw Ghetto

Disagreements with governor general Hans Frank led to Krüger's dismissal on 9 November 1943. He was replaced by Wilhelm Koppe.

Due to Krüger, Koppe and their troops and policemen, altogether more than 6 million Poles (2.9 million of them were Polish Jews) were killed in gas chambers, in forced labour camps, during mass shootings, from hunger, disease, cold or because of mandatory expulsions from their houses or farms, and transportation of these empty-handed victims on the bare fields of General Government. Almost the entire population of Polish Jews was exterminated. Travelling Roma were treated by German authority equally to Jews (Romani genocide).

The economical downfall of the Polish industry, the railway network, the agriculture, the forestry and total destruction of the country (the retreating Germans blew up Polish sea port in Gdynia) were not in connection with the military actions only. Most of the victims have perished due to political doctrine, classifying all the Slavic nations as subhumans, and other administrative and compulsory orders and restrictions set up by the new government, with SS-Obergruppenführer Krüger as the most senior commander of SS and Police in German-occupied Poland.

I have nothing against – after the war will be won – the extermination of all this Slavic mob.

The Polish Secret State ordered his death, but an assassination attempt on 20 April 1943 in Kraków failed when two bombs hurled at his car missed the target.

Six months later, he wrote in a letter:

I have lost honour and reputation due to my four-year struggle in the GG (General Government)
(German: Ich habe für meinen vierjährigen Kampf im GG Ehre und Reputation verloren).

=== Later career and suicide ===
From November 1943 until April 1944 Krüger served with the SS Division Prinz Eugen conducting Nazi security warfare in occupied Yugoslavia. While ostensibly engaged in anti-partisan fight in Yugoslavia, this unit became notorious for committing atrocities against the civilian population.

On 8 July 1944, Krüger was given the rank of General der Waffen-SS. From June to August he took over the command over the SS Division Nord in northern Finland. From August 1944 until February 1945 Krüger was commanding general of the V SS Mountain Corps. In February 1945 he was Himmler's representative at the German southeast front and in April and May 1945 he was commander of a combat unit of the Orpo at Army Group South (known as Army Group Ostmark after 1 May 1945). At the end of the war Krüger took his own life in Upper Austria.

== Awards ==
- Iron Cross (1914) 2nd Class (7 September 1914), 1st Class (17 February 1915)
- Knight's Cross of the Royal House Order of Hohenzollern with Swords (25 April 1918)
- Wound Badge in Silver (1918)
- War Merit Cross 2nd and 1st Class with Swords (20 April 1942)
- Clasp to the Iron Cross (1939) 2nd Class (2 August 1943) & 1st Class (15 May 1944)
- Knight's Cross of the Iron Cross on 22 October 1944 as commander of the 6. SS-Gebirgs-Division "Nord"

== See also ==
- Palmiry massacre
- Massacres in Piaśnica
- Szczurowa massacre – part of genocide on Polish Romani
- Polish culture during World War II
