= World War II memorials and cemeteries in the Netherlands =

During World War II, the Netherlands was the scene of five years of continuous air warfare between the Allied and the Nazis as the Netherlands lies en route from England to Germany and was designated and built up as the foremost line of Nazi air defence of Germany. Also, in 1944 there was heavy land fighting during the largest Allied airborne attack of the WWII in the south and east of the country in 1944–45. Thousands of airmen, soldiers and others of many nations were killed, and their war graves in some 4,000 locations are in the care of the Dutch War Cemetery Organisation (Dutch: Oorlogsgravenstichting).

The Netherlands has over 3,900 cemeteries and memorials, the highest in absolute numbers and in density in the whole of Europe, according to the official national government committee for remembrance. Many of the memorials are dedicated many of the over 3,000 crashed Allied warplanes and their crews. The largest memorial and cemetery is the Netherlands American Cemetery with over 8,000 graves.

The largest WW-II-related cemetery in Europe and also the most controversial, is the Nazi cemetery of Ysselsteyn, that describes itself as "German military war cemetery", with almost 32,000 graves, only about 70% of them military, the rest SS and also Dutch traitors. The designation "German" is incorrect because about 20 other nationalities are buried there, among others Dutch members of the Waffen-SS, Dutch torturers and executioners, and also Austrians, Georgians, Poles, Czechs.

In addition to cemeteries, the Netherlands has constructed eight carillons (musical instruments of bells) to memorialize the destruction of bells during the war and ring out world peace.

== List of World War II memorials and cemeteries in the Netherlands ==
=== Dutch war graves ===
In the Netherlands, about 9,000 war graves are located.

- Field of Honour Loenen (Loenen) – 4,000 soldiers and civilians
- Grebbeberg War Cemetery (Rhenen) – 800 soldiers
- Mierlo War Cemetery (Mierlo) – 1 soldier
- Erebegraafplaats Bloemendaal (Bloemendaal) – 373 people of the resistance
- Rusthof cemetery (Amersfoort) – 150 victims of Kamp Amersfoort
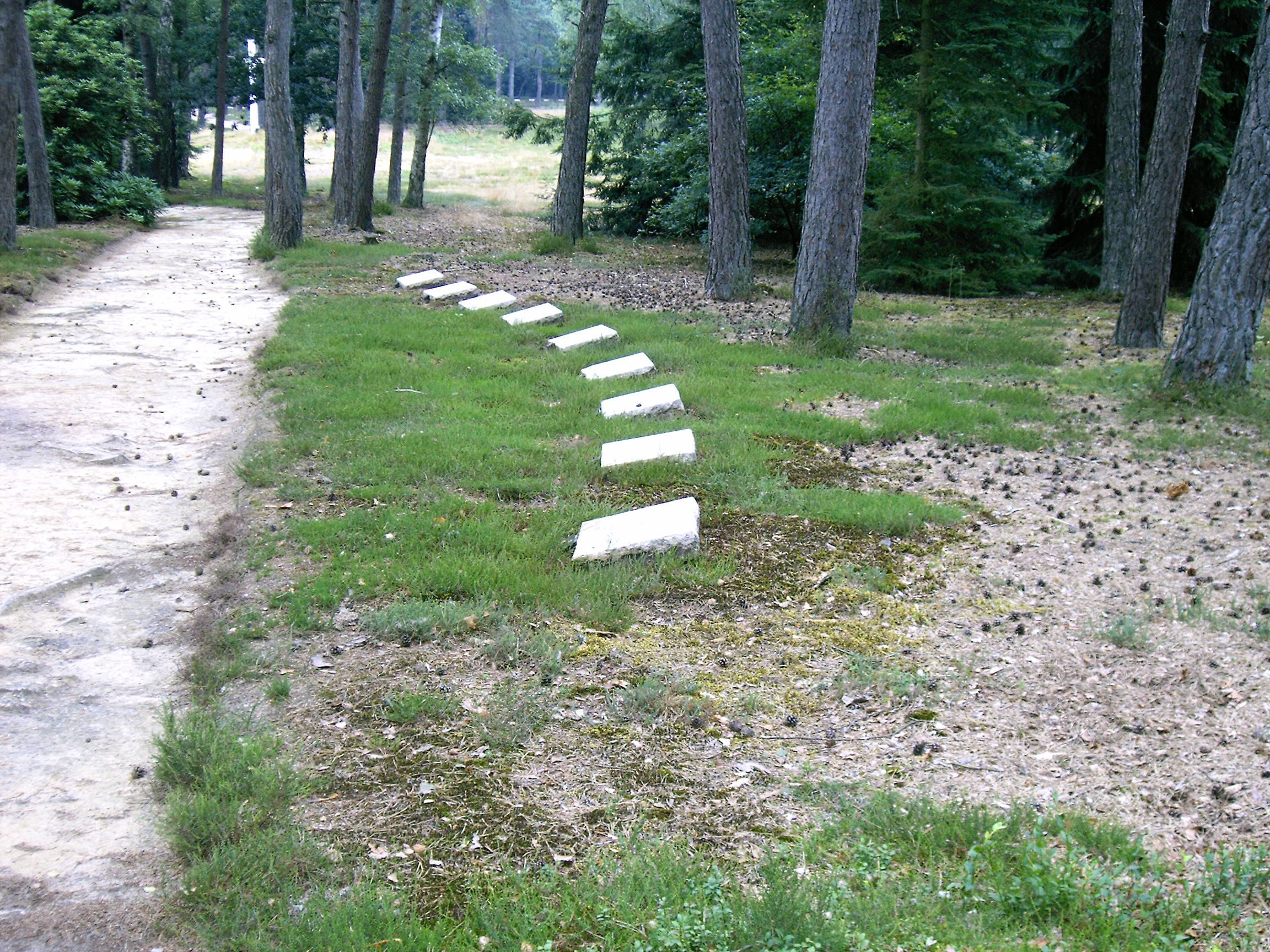
Field of Honour Loenen

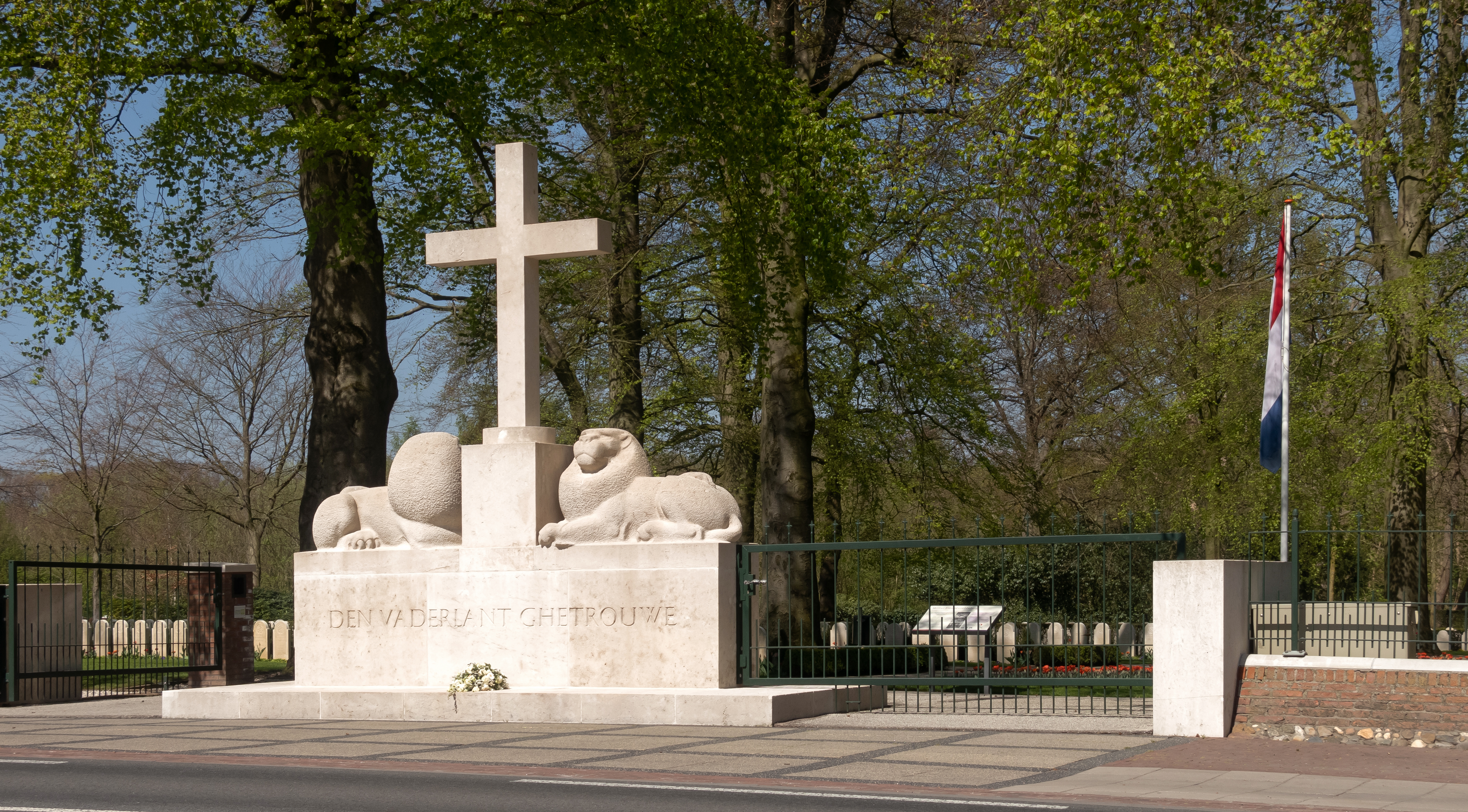
Field of Honour Grebbeberg

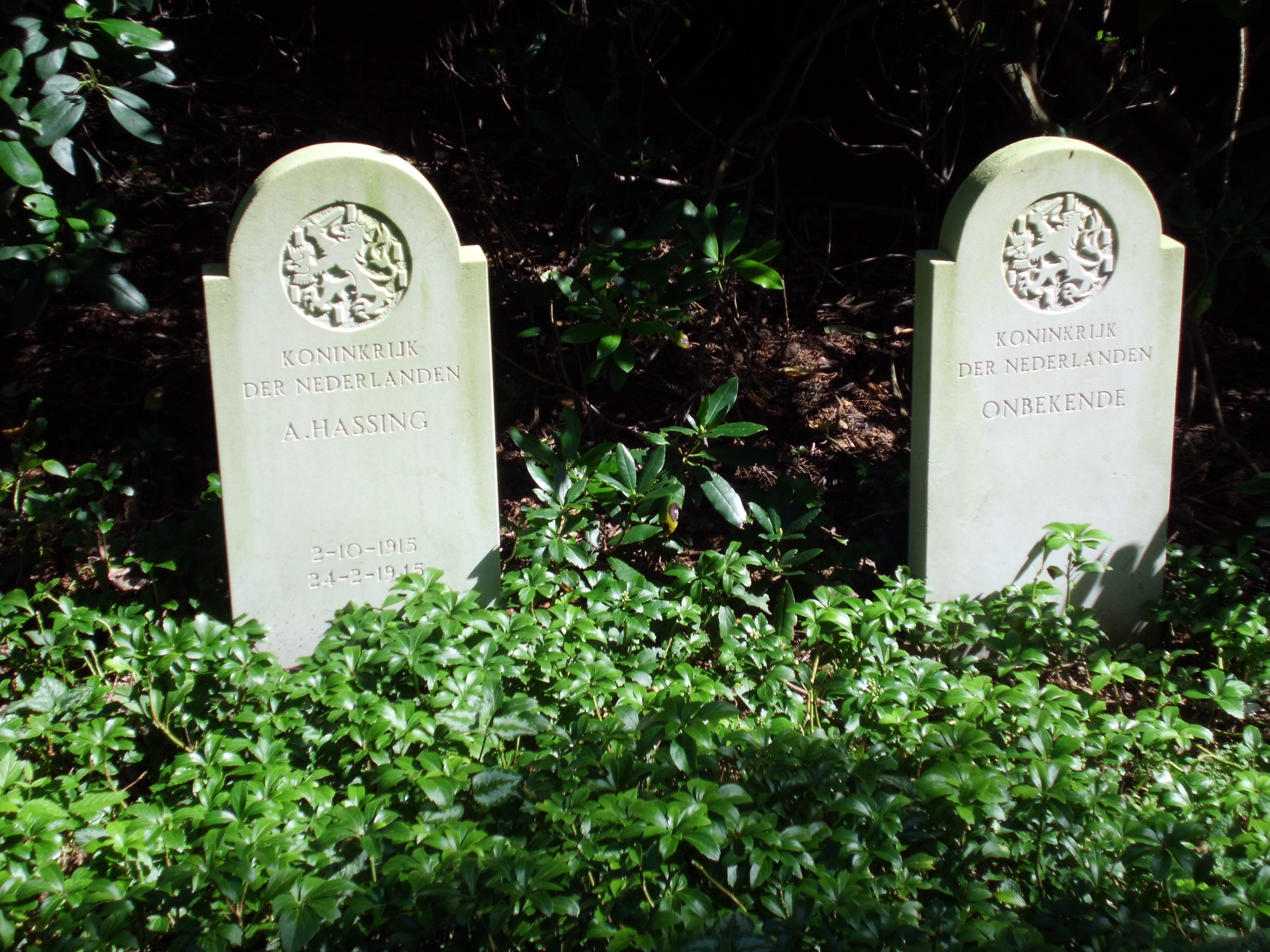
Rusthof Amersfoort

=== Australian, British and Canadian war graves ===
- Arnhem Oosterbeek Airborne War Cemetery – 1,678 soldiers
- Beilen General Cemetery – 7 soldiers (of whom one is French)
- Bergen op Zoom Canadian War Cemetery – 1,118 soldiers (of whom 971 are Canadian)
- Brunssum War Cemetery – 328 soldiers
- Driel cemetery of the protestant church – 1 soldier
- Eindhoven (Woensel) General Cemetery – 700 soldiers
- Enschede – 50 soldiers (as well as 11 soldiers from the First World War)
- Groesbeek Canadian War Cemetery – 2,610 soldiers (of whom 2,339 are Canadian)
- Holten Canadian War Cemetery – 1,393 soldiers (of whom 1,355 are Canadian)
- Losser – 2 soldiers
- De Lutte – 5 soldiers
- Lonneker – 1 soldier
- Mierlo War Cemetery – 665 soldiers (of whom one is Dutch)
- Milsbeek War Cemetery – 210 soldiers
- Mook War Cemetery – 322 soldiers
- Nederweert War Cemetery – 363 soldiers
- Nijmegen Jonkerbos War Cemetery – 1,629 soldiers
- Overdinkel – 1 soldier
- Overloon War Cemetery – 279 soldiers
- Rusthof Cemetery – 234 soldiers
- Sittard War Cemetery – 239 soldiers
- Swartbroek Churchyard – 52 soldiers (of whom one is French)
- Uden War Cemetery – 703 soldiers (of whom two are Polish)
- Valkenswaard War Cemetery – 220 soldiers
- Venray War Cemetery – 693 soldiers (of whom one is Polish)
- Vredenhof Schiermonnikoog – 65 soldiers
- Wageningen general cemetery – 8 soldiers
- Werkendam War Cemetery – 23 soldiers (of whom one is Australian)
- Warnsveld (Wichmond) General Cemetery – 5 Canadian and 8 UK airmen in this civilian cemetery
- Zundert – 13 soldiers
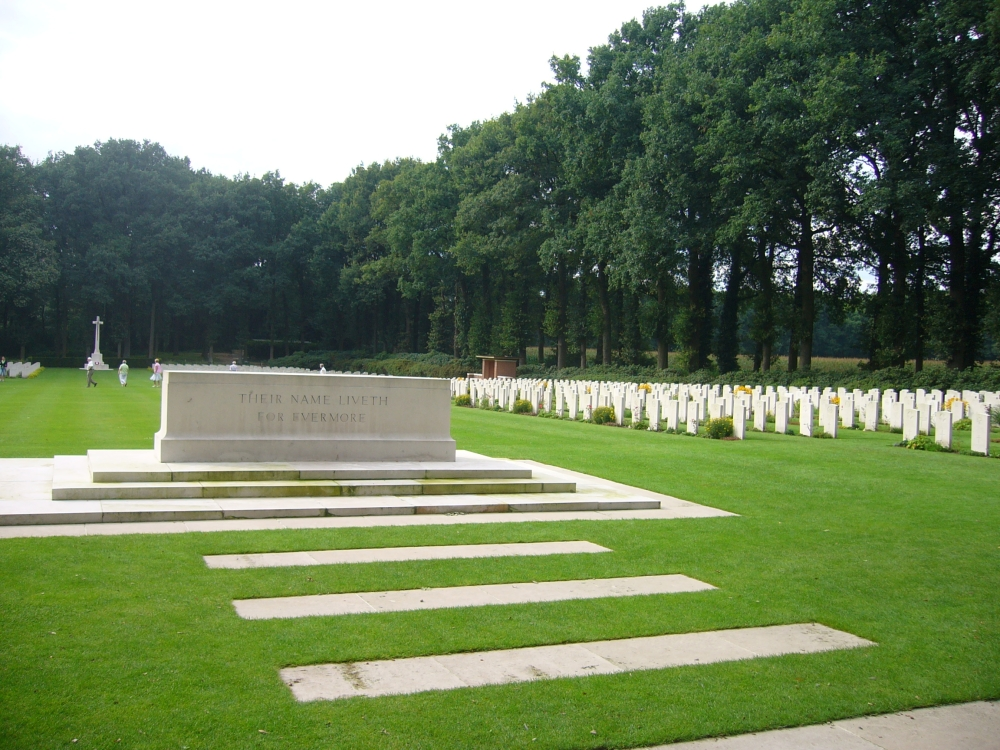
Arnhem Oosterbeek Airborne War Cemetery

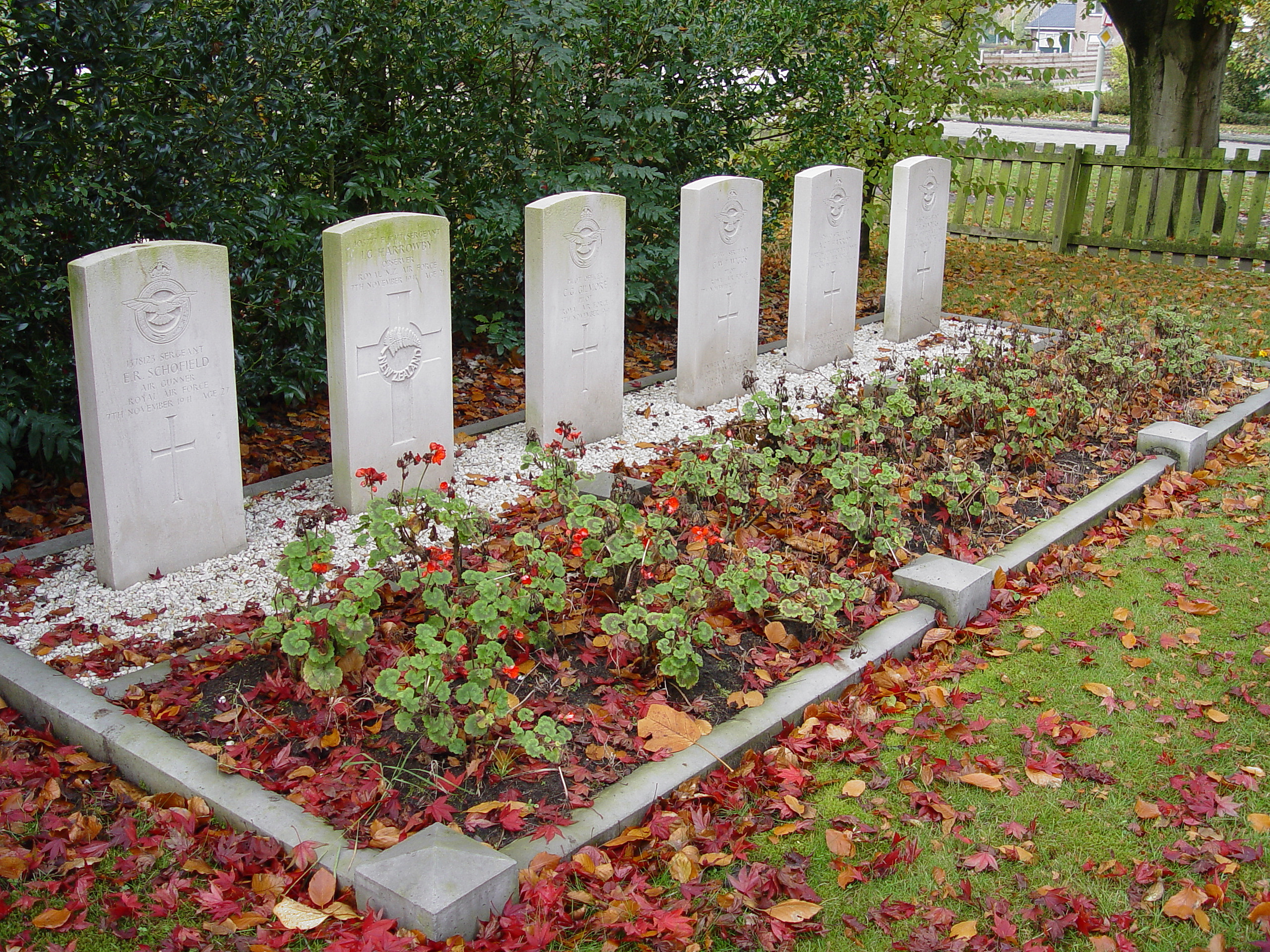
Beilen cemetery

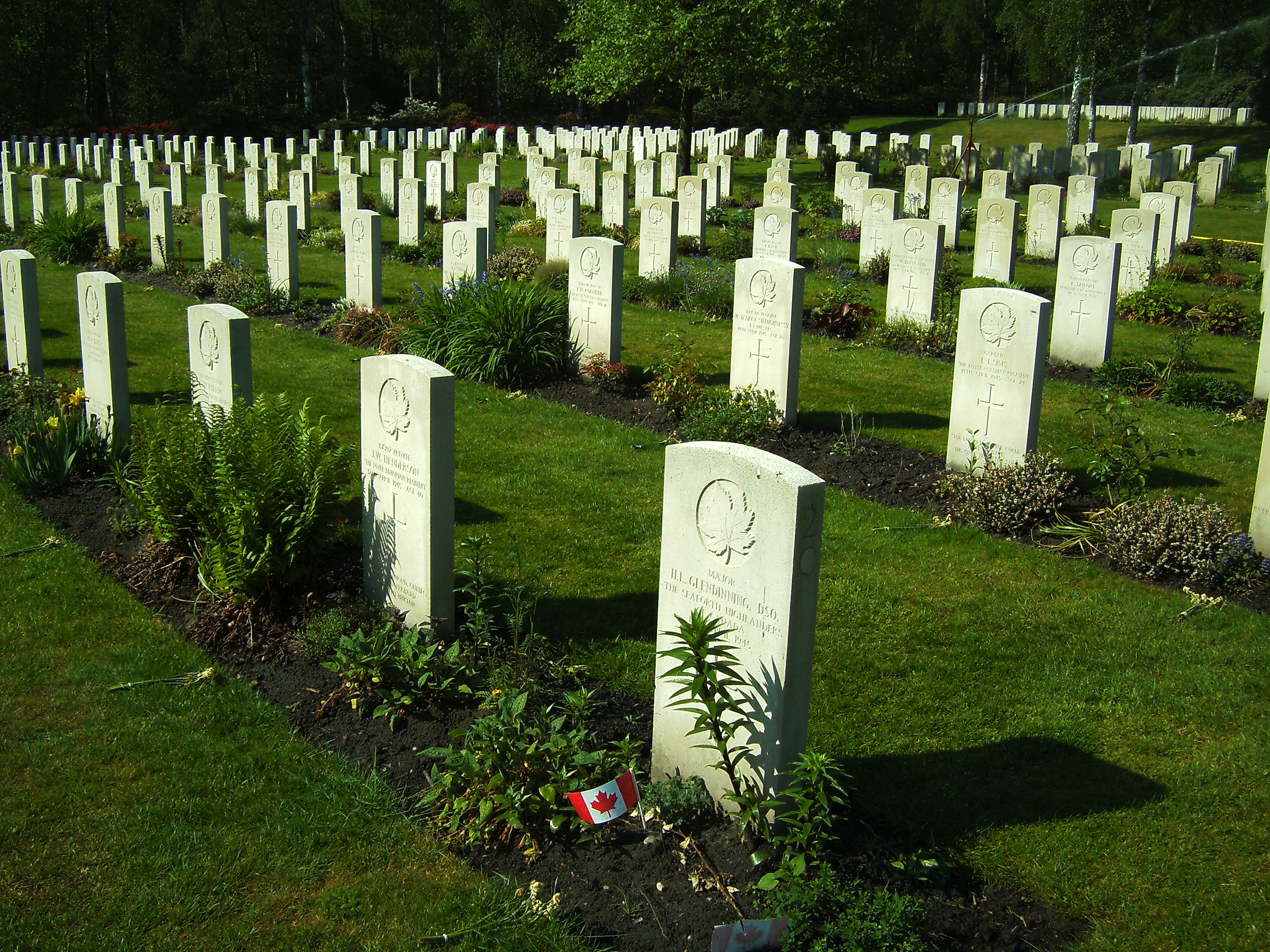
Holten Canadian War Cemetery

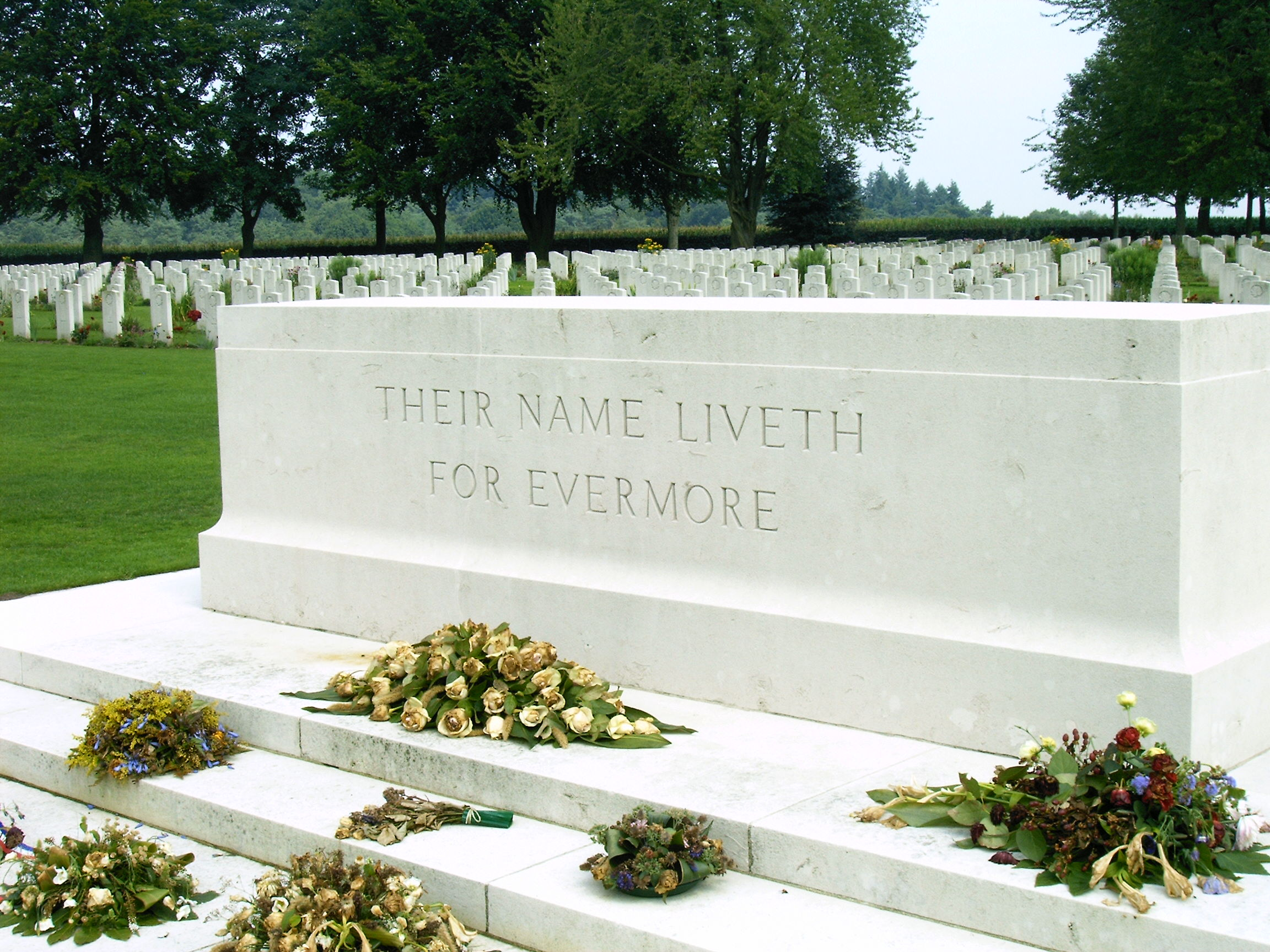
Groesbeek Canadian War Cemetery

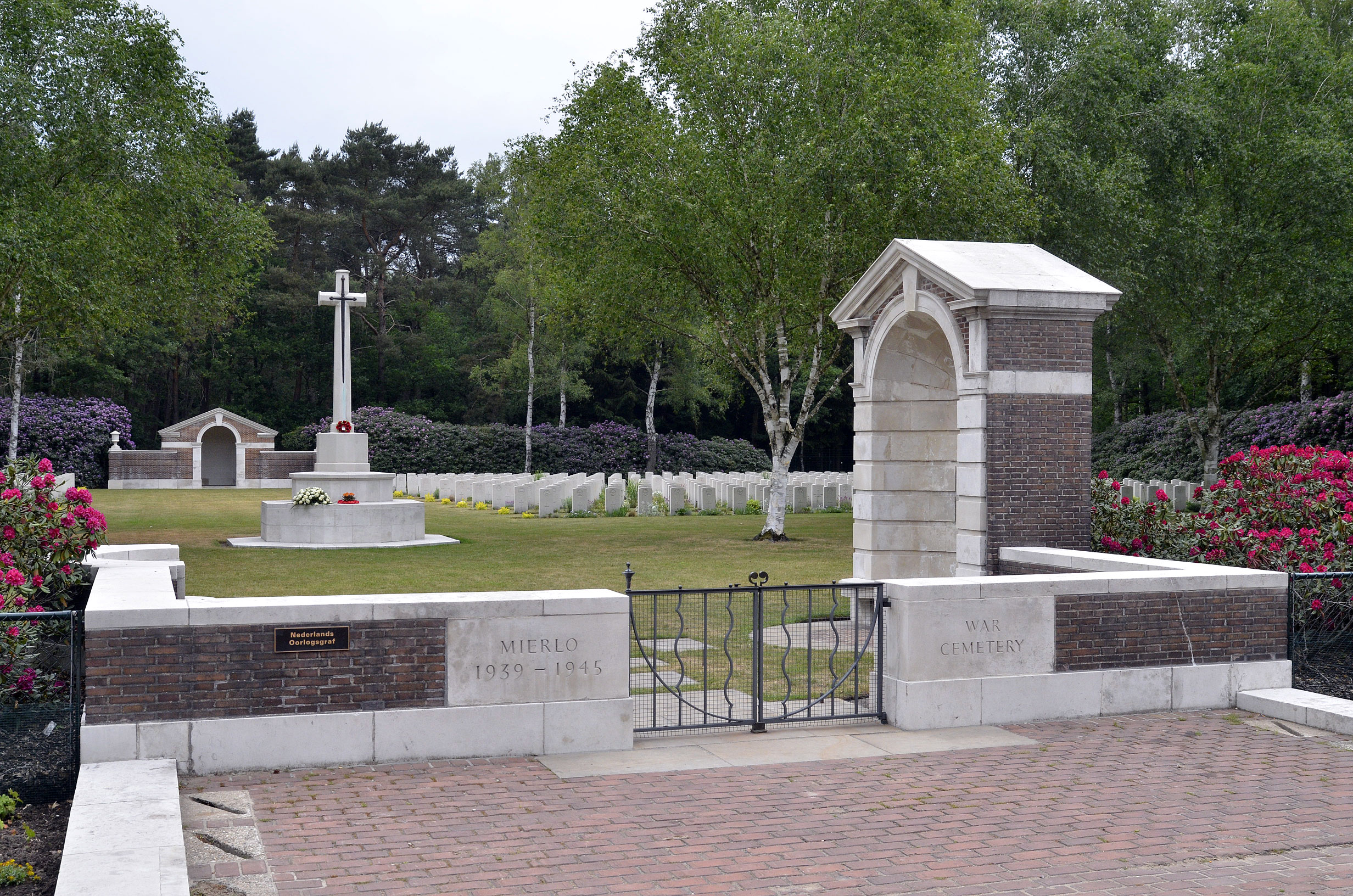
Mierlo War Cemetery

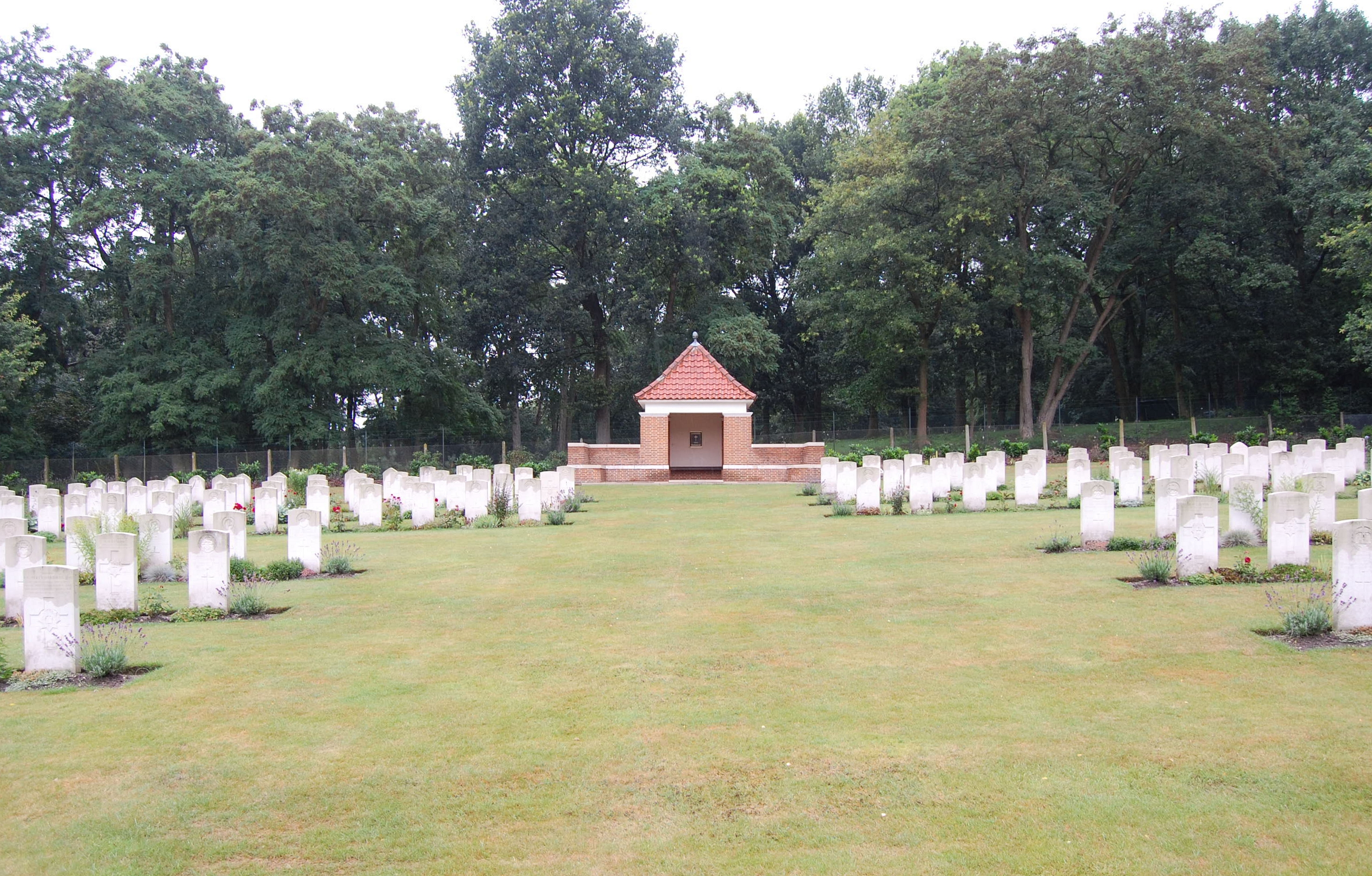
Mook War Cemetery

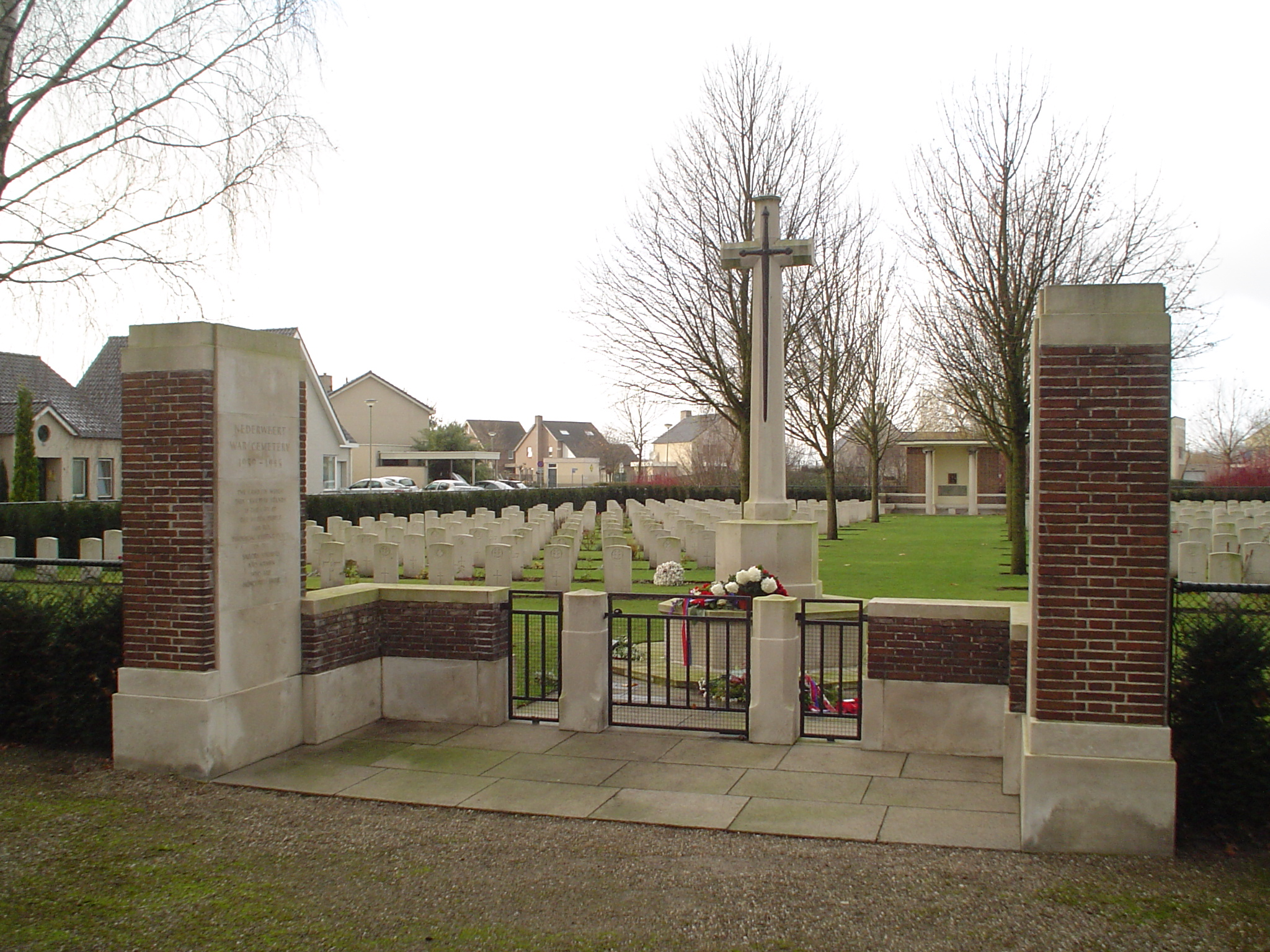
Nederweert War Cemetery

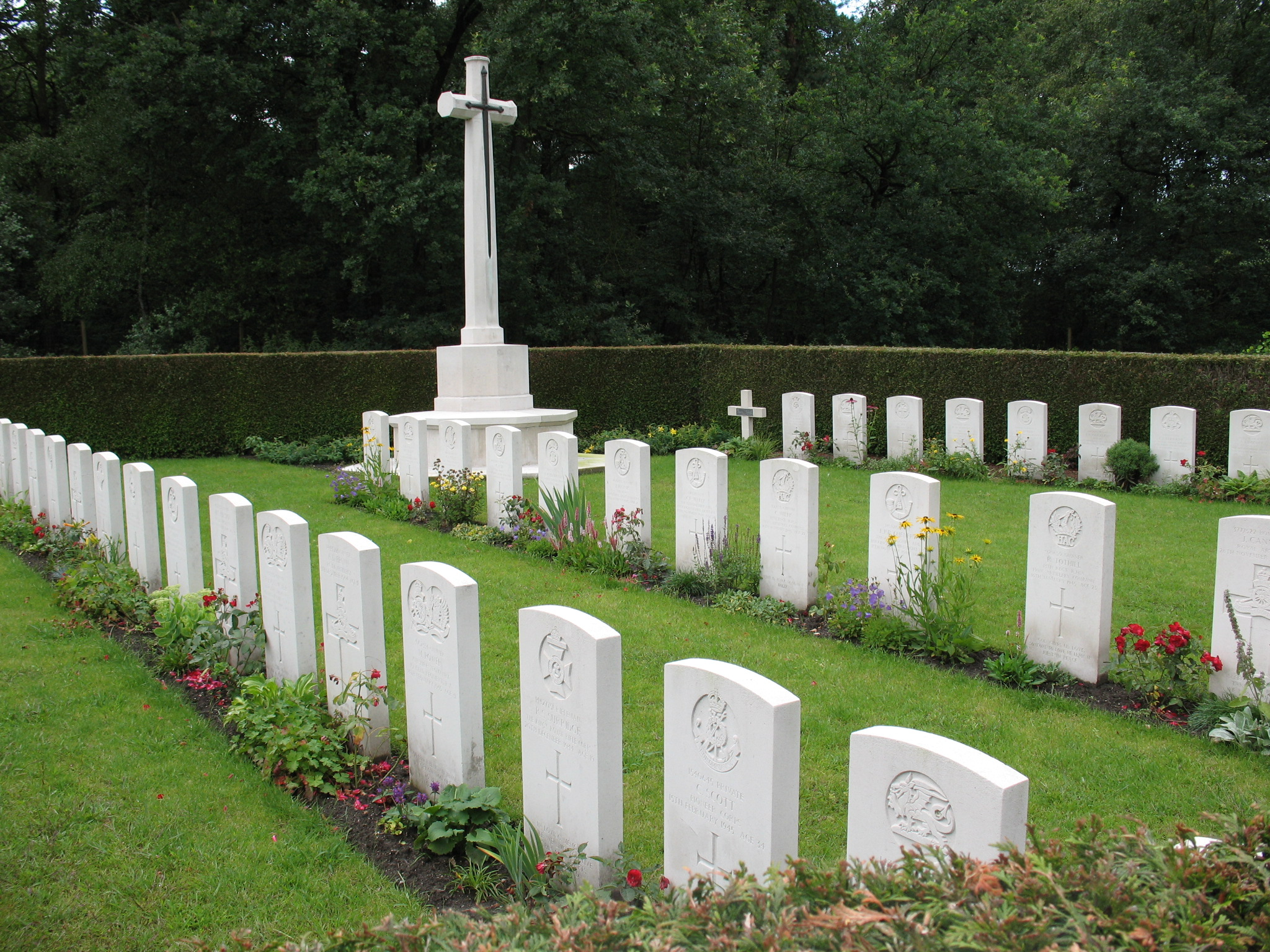
Swartbroek Churchyard

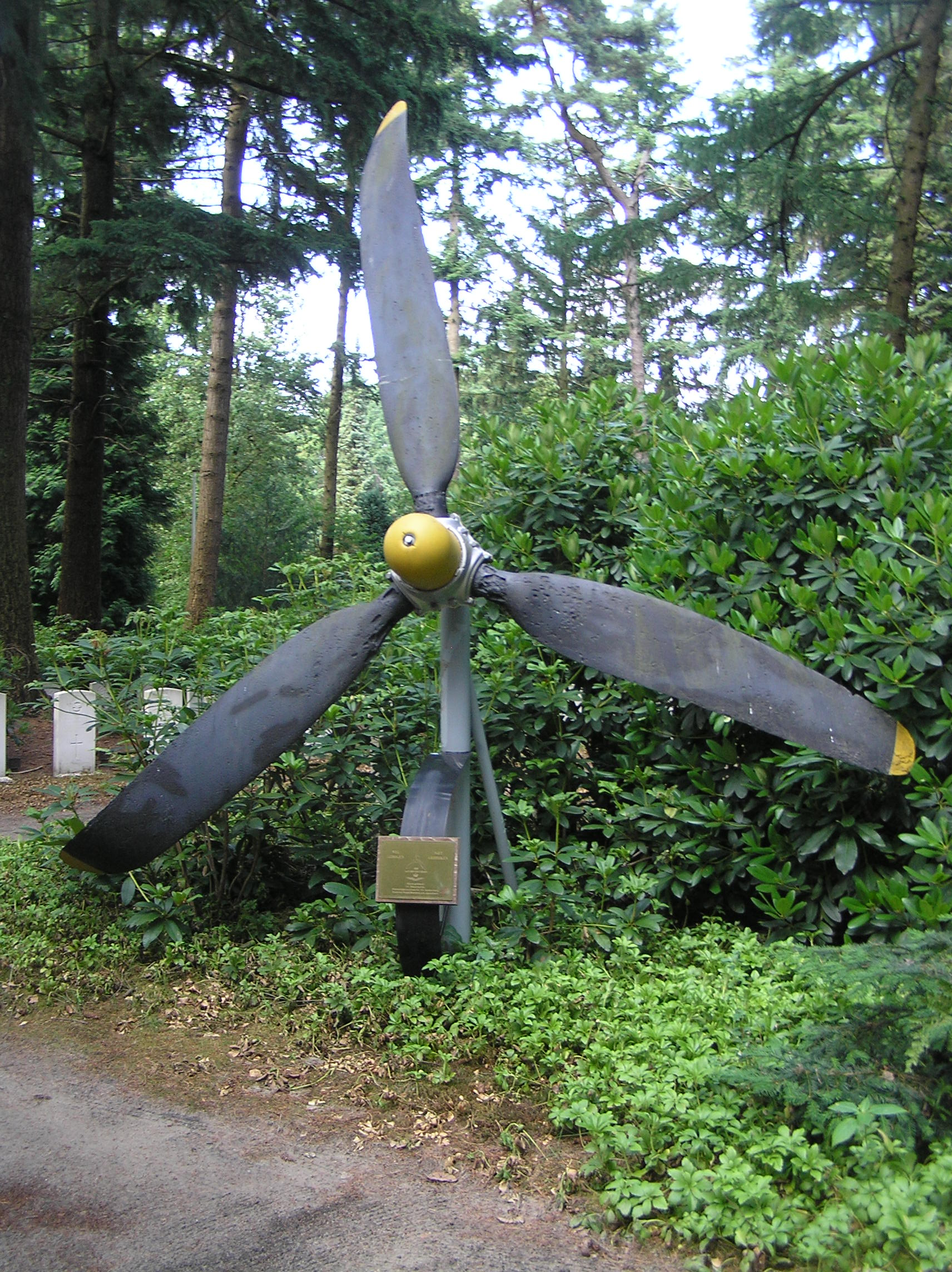
Rusthof Leusden

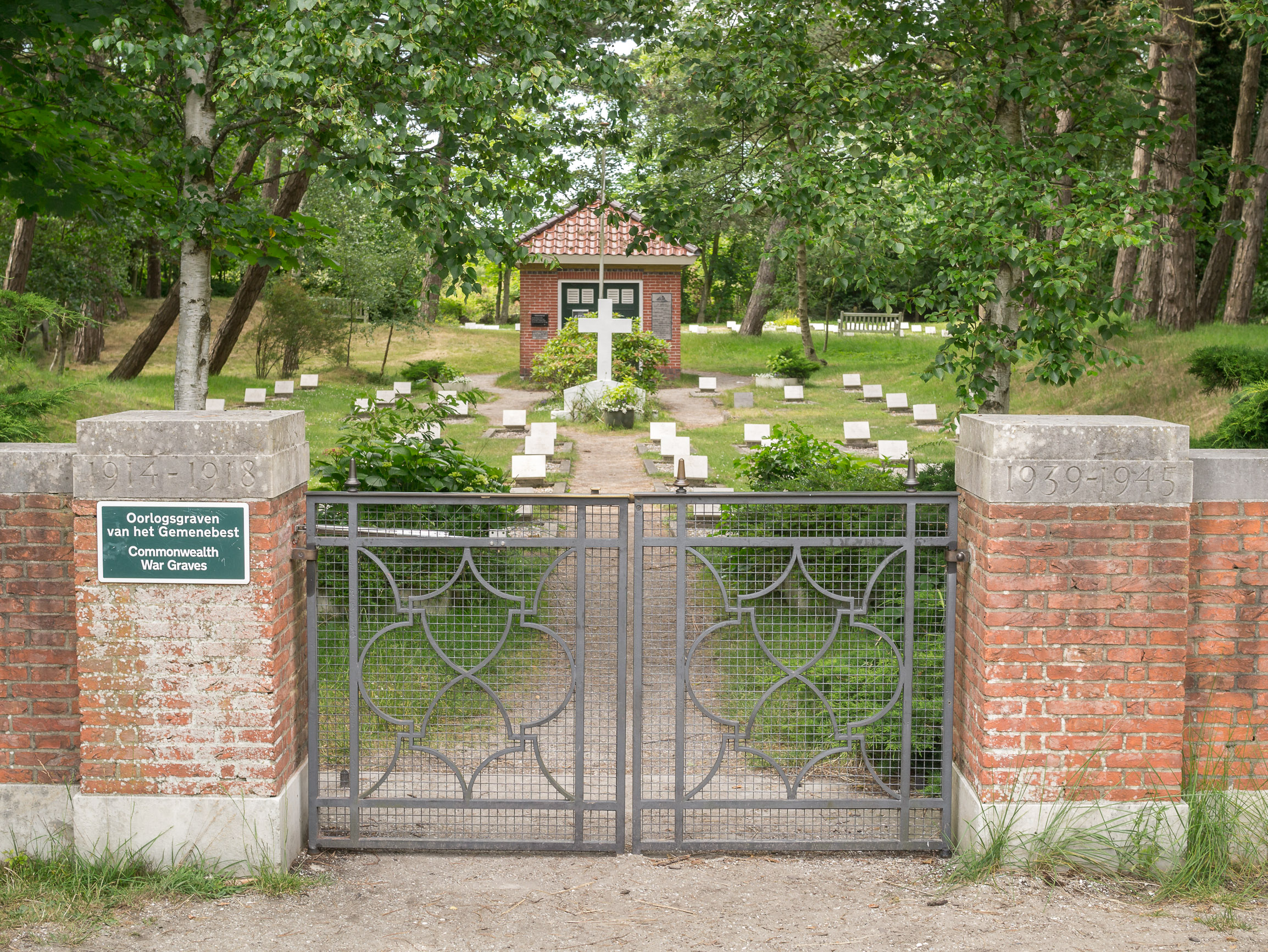
Vredenhof Schiermonnikoog

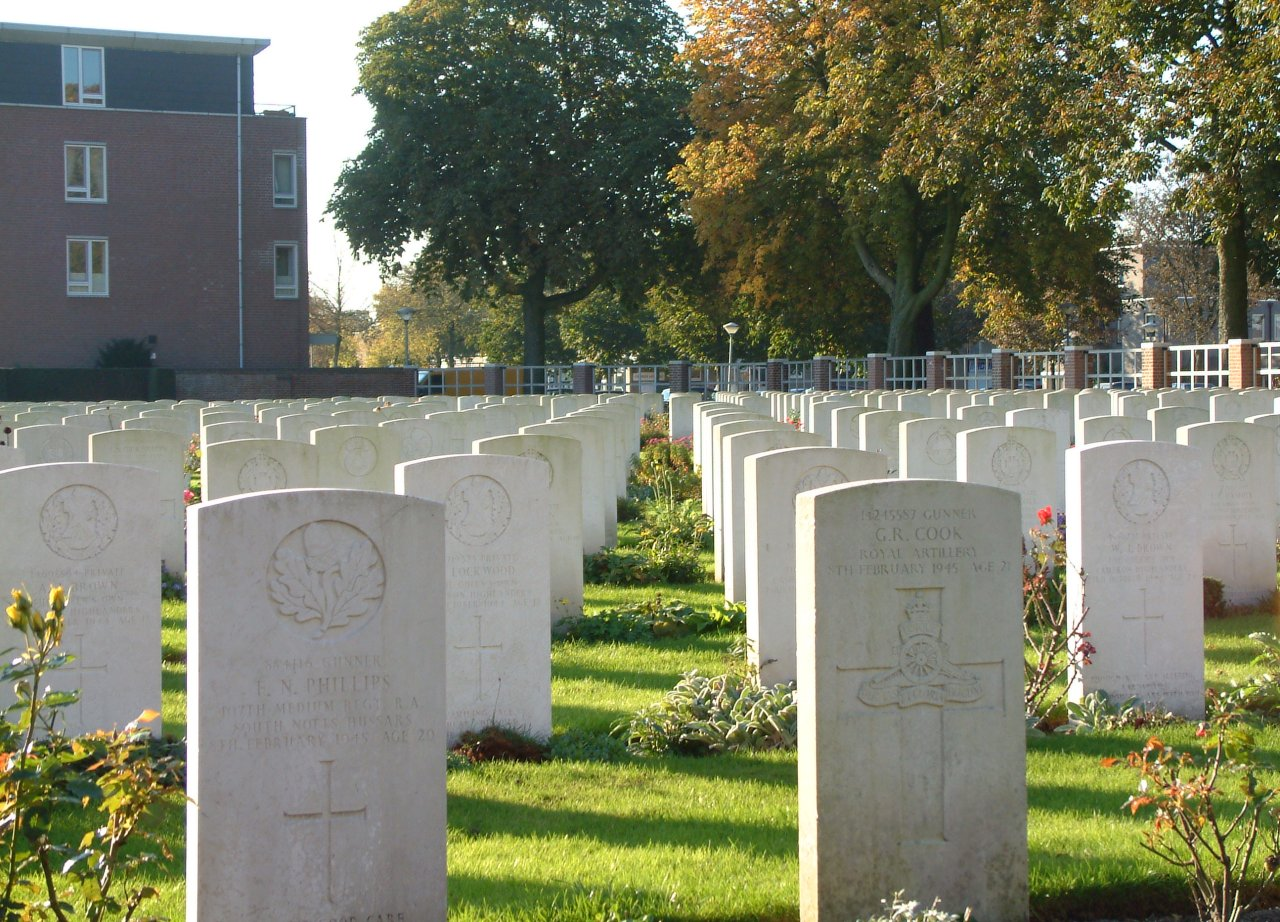
Uden War Cemetery

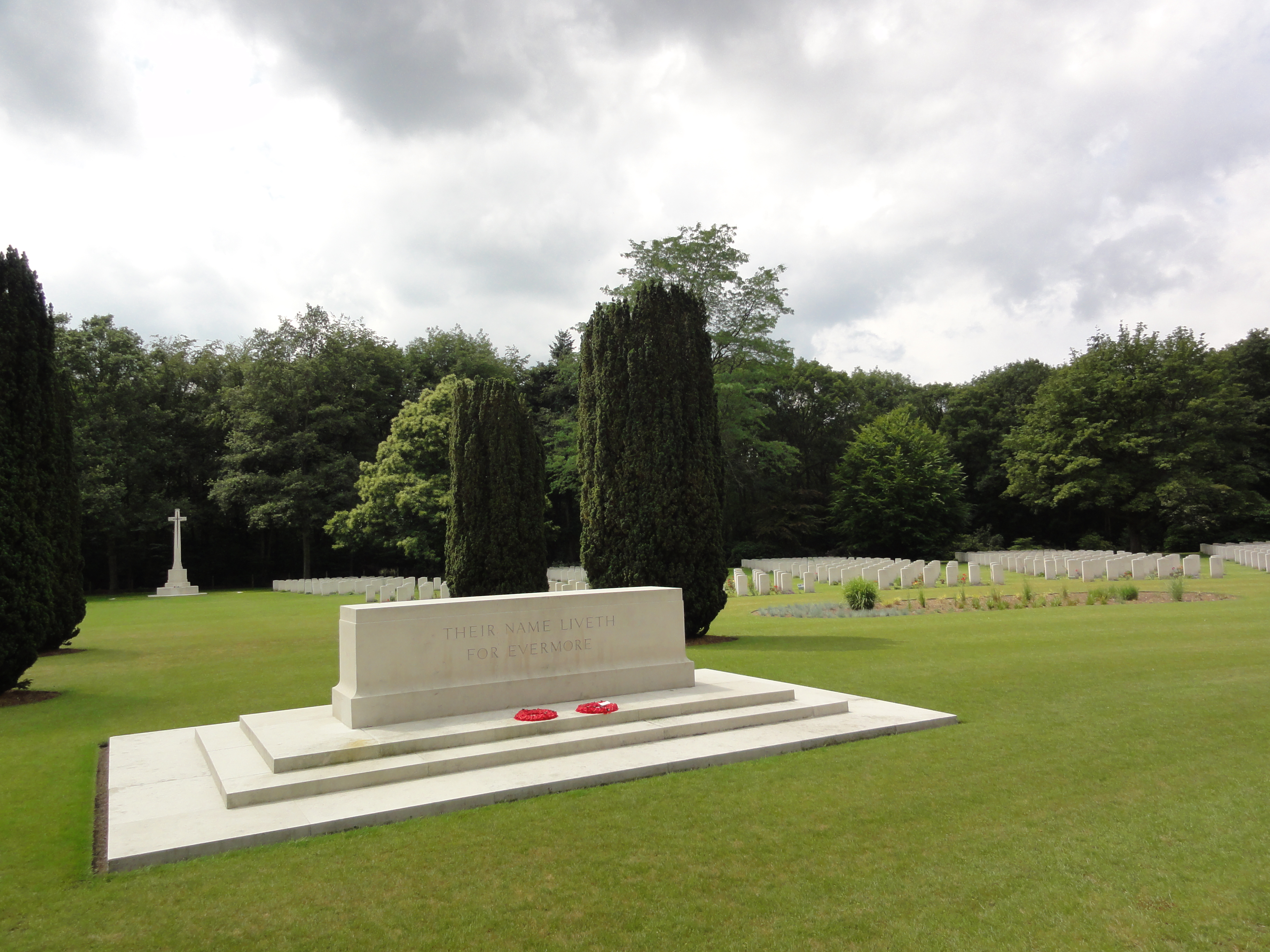
Jonkerbos War Cemetery

=== U.S. war graves ===
With few exceptions, all American war graves are located at the U.S. Military Cemetery Margraten.

- U.S. Military Cemetery Margraten (Margraten) – 8,302 soldiers
- Grave yard of the Old Church in Zoetermeer – 1 airman
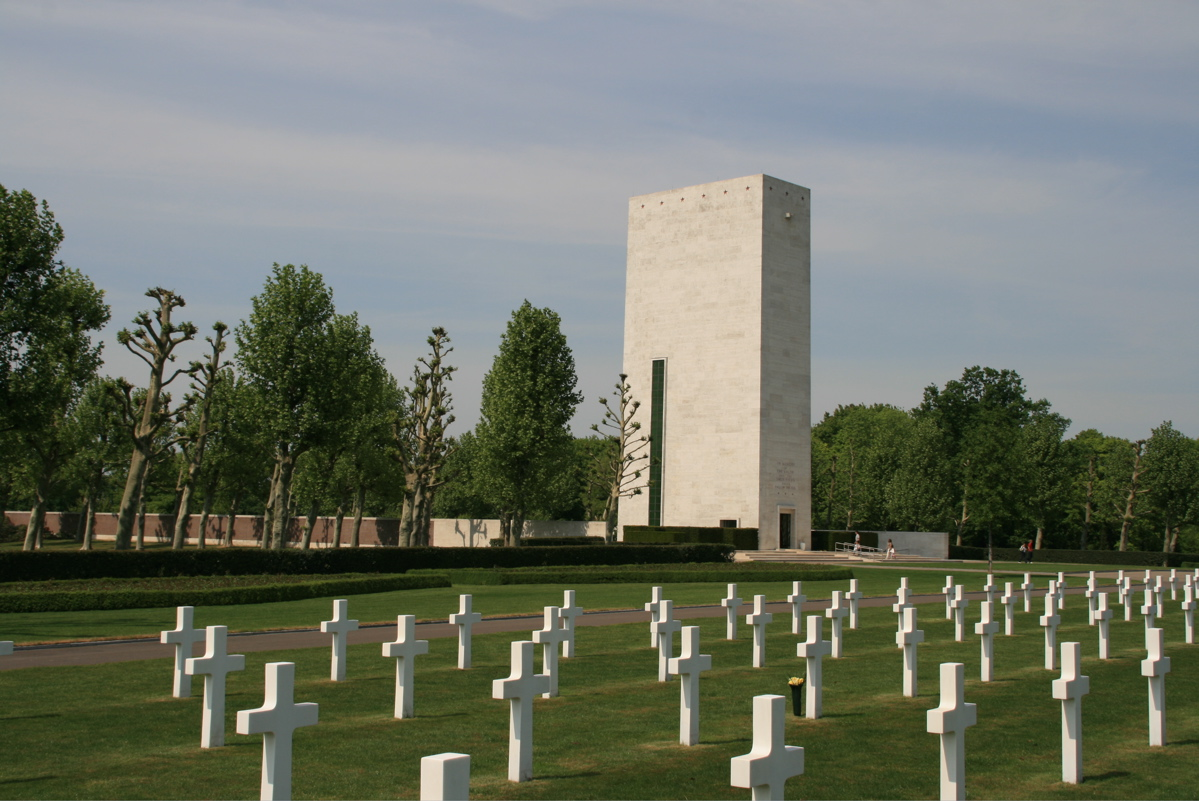
U.S. Military Cemetery Margraten

=== Belgian war graves ===
- Belgian Field of Honour 1940 (Maastricht) – 43 soldiers
- Belgian Military Field of Honour 1940 (Willemstad) – 153 soldiers
- Bergen op Zoom War Cemetery – 2 Belgian graves
- Dokkum Roman Catholic Cemetery – 1 Belgian grave
- Groesbeek Canadian War Cemetery – 3 Belgian graves
- Harlingen General Cemetery – 3 Belgian graves
- Holten Canadian War Cemetery – 1 Belgian grave
- Nijmegen Jonkerbos War Cemetery – 4 Belgian graves
- Vlissingen Noorder begraafplaats – 1 Belgian grave

=== French war graves ===
- France Military Field of Honour (Kapelle) – 229 soldiers
- Beilen General Cemetery – 1 soldier
- Schiermonnikoog Drenkelingenkerkhof Vredenhof – 9 soldiers
- Soesterberg – 15 soldiers of World War One
- Swartbroek (gem. Weert) Churchyard – 1 soldier
- Vlissingen Noorder Cemetery – 2 soldiers
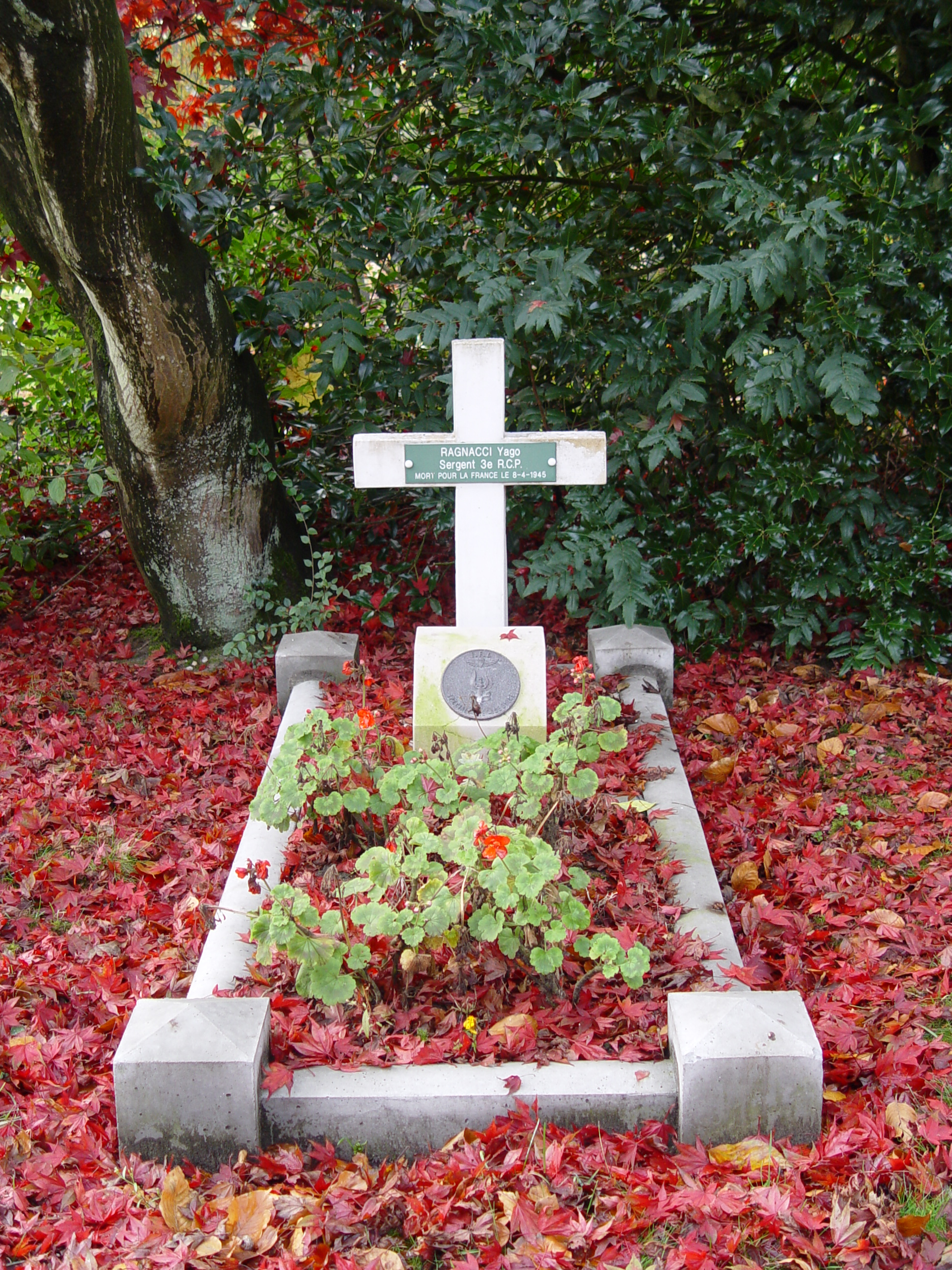
Beilen General Cemetery

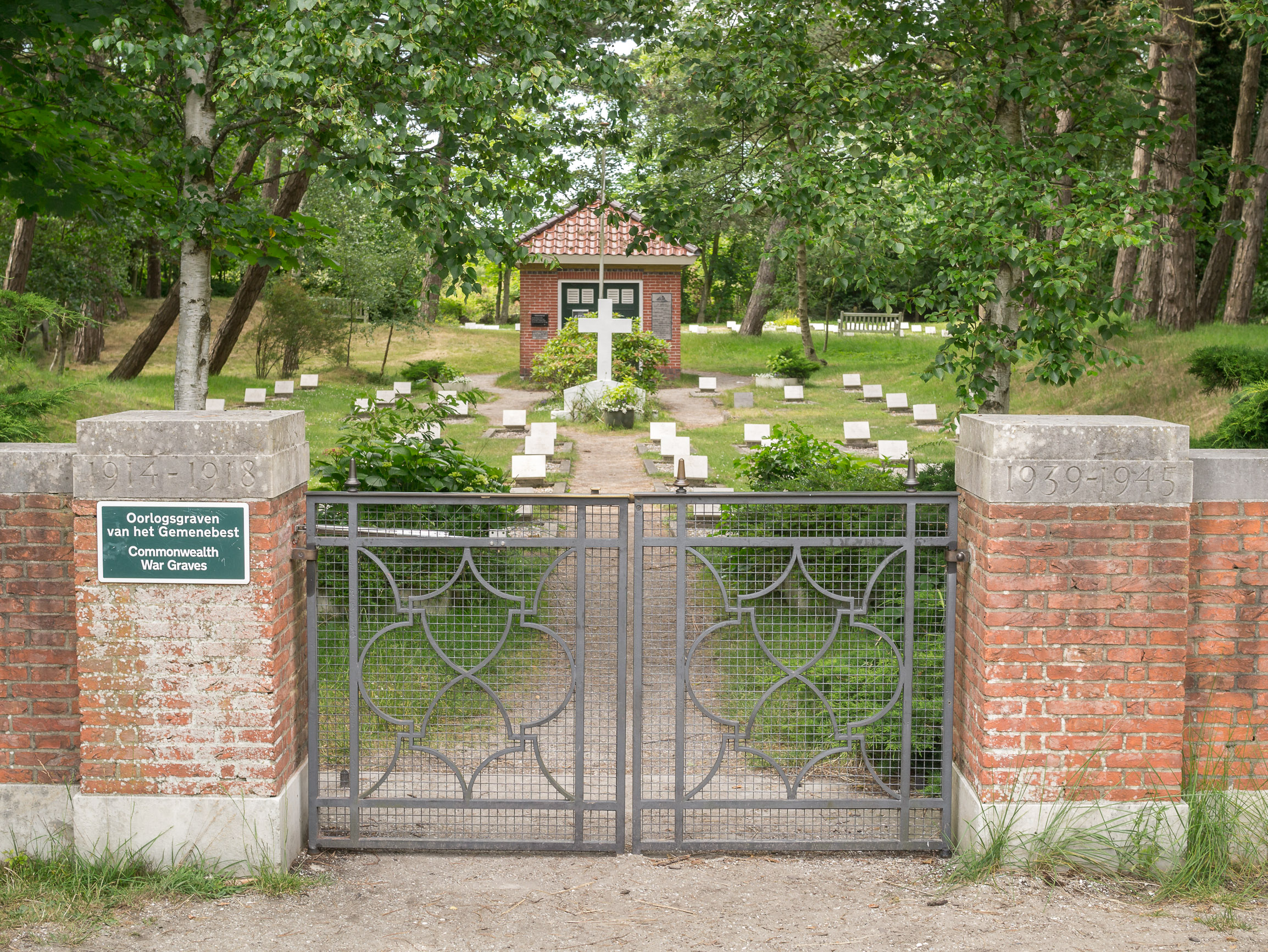
Vredenhof Schiermonnikoog

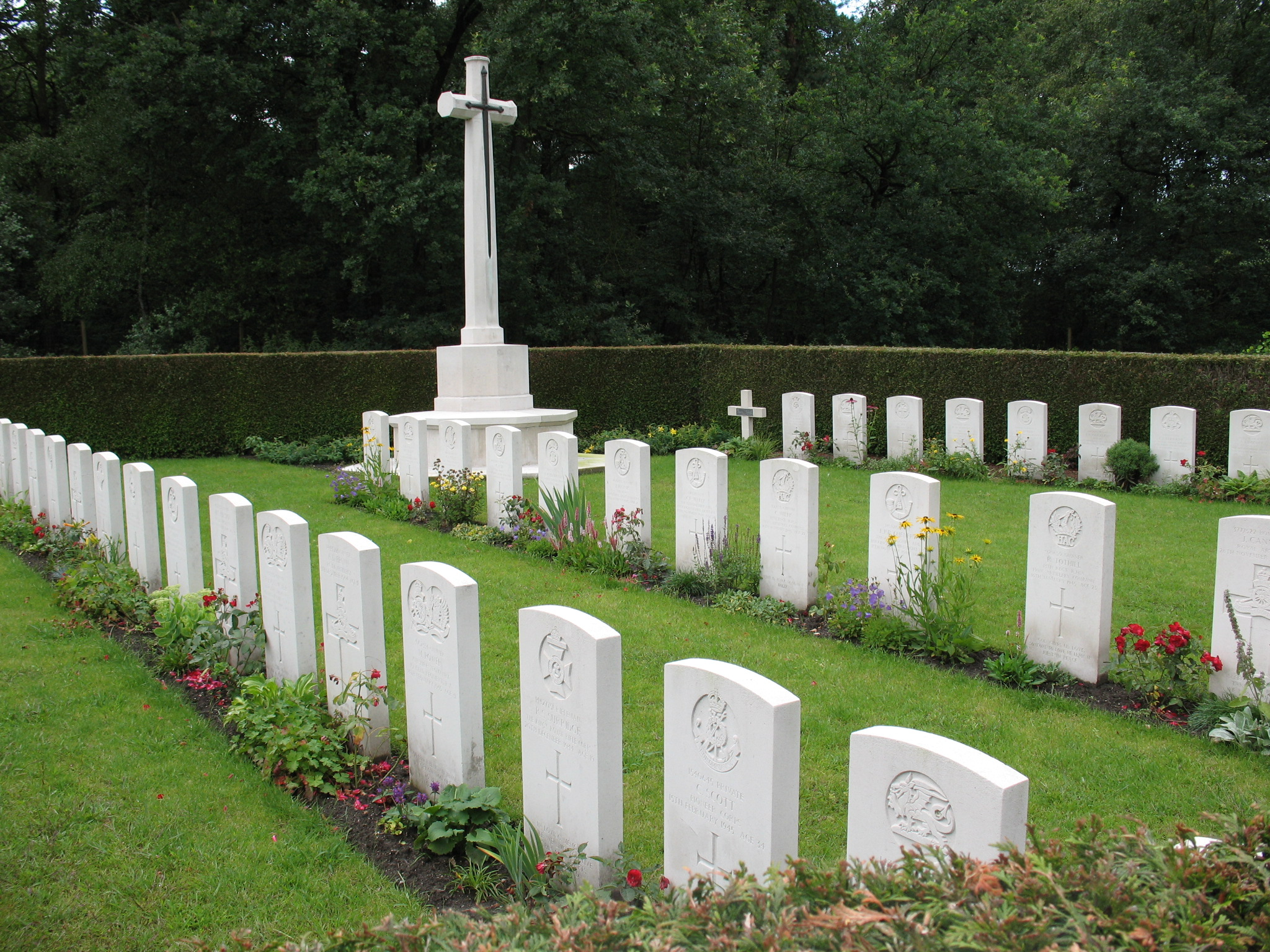
Swartbroek Cemetery

=== Soviet war graves ===
- Russian Field of Honour Leusden (Leusden) – 865 soldiers
- Groesbeek Canadian War Cemetery (Groesbeek) – 1 soldier

==== Georgian war graves ====
- Field of Honour of the Georgians under Loladse (Texel) – 476 soldiers
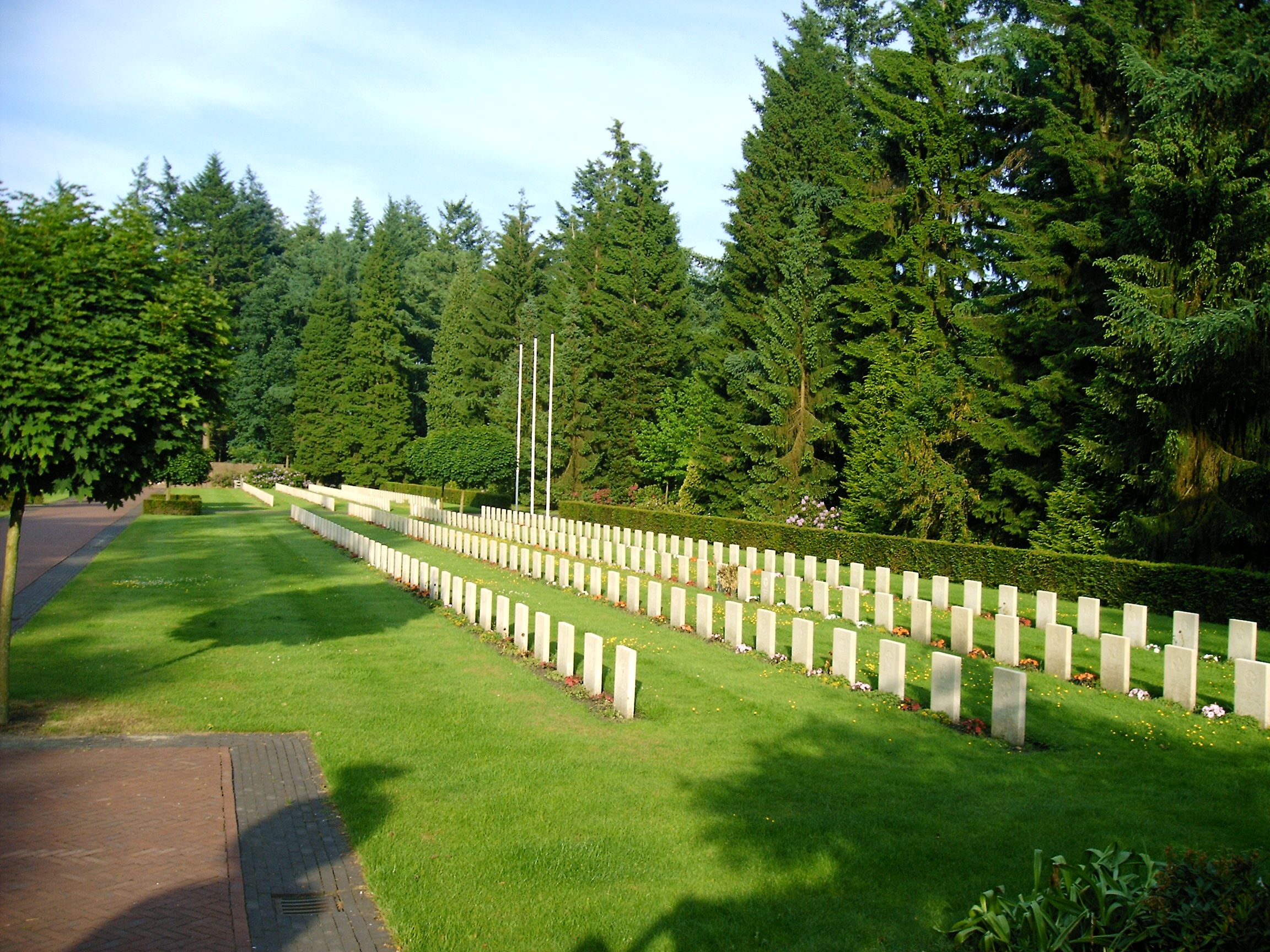
Georgian Field of Honour Leusden

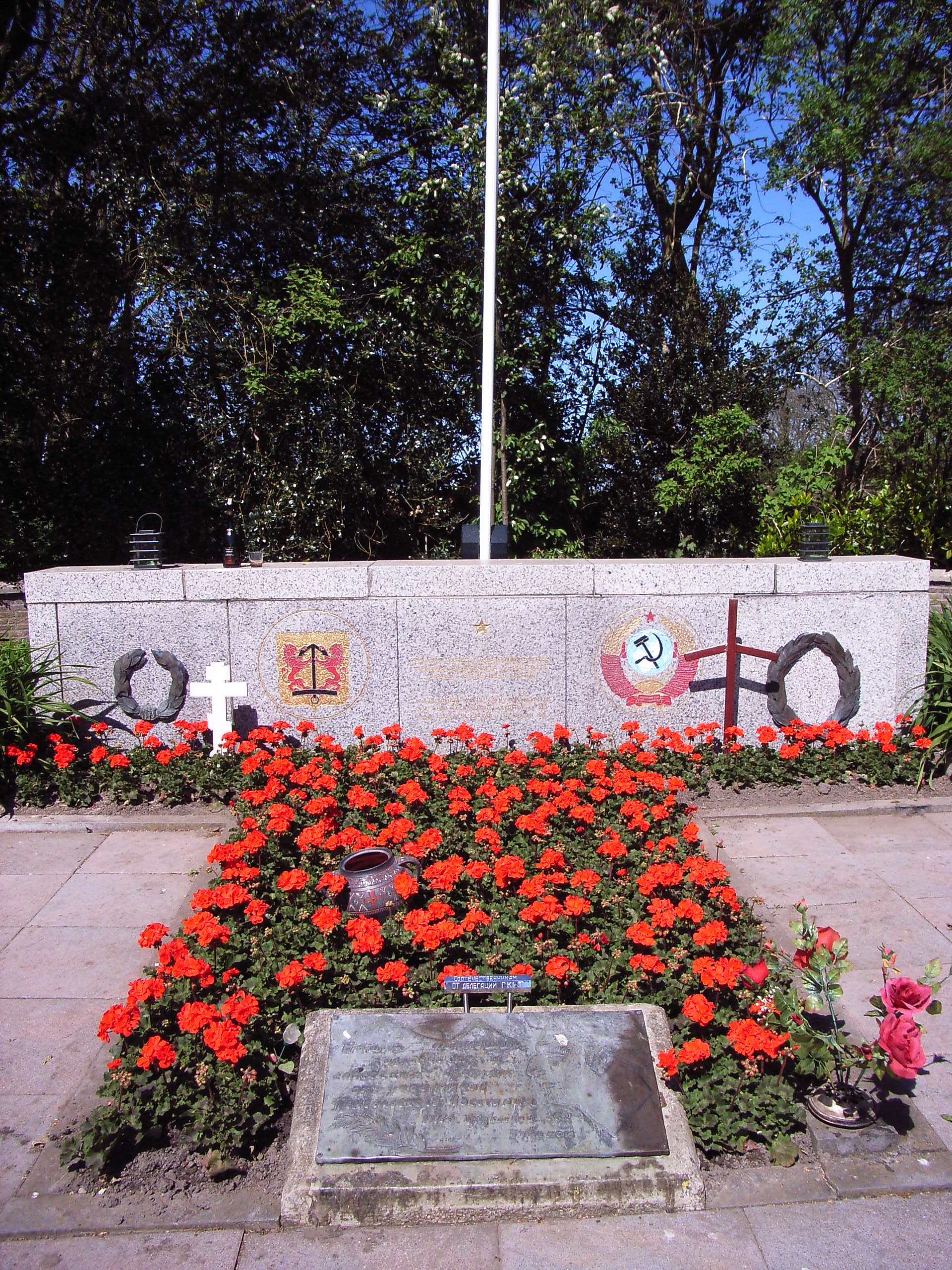
Field of Honour Georgiërs Loladse

=== Polish war graves ===
About 500 Polish war graves are located in the Netherlands.

- Polish Military Field of Honour (Breda) – 156 soldiers
- Polish Field of Honour Oosterhof (Oosterhout) – 30 soldiers
- Polish Field of Honour Ginneken (Breda) – 80 soldiers
- Polish Field of Honour Alphen (Alphen) – 18 soldiers
- Polish Field of Honour Axel – 22 soldiers
- Mook War Cemetery – 11 soldiers
- Arnhem Oosterbeek Airborne War Cemetery – 73 soldiers
- Schiermonnikoog drenkelingenkerkhof Vredenhof – 3 soldiers
- Uden War Cemetery – 2 soldiers
- Werkendam War Cemetery – 1 soldier
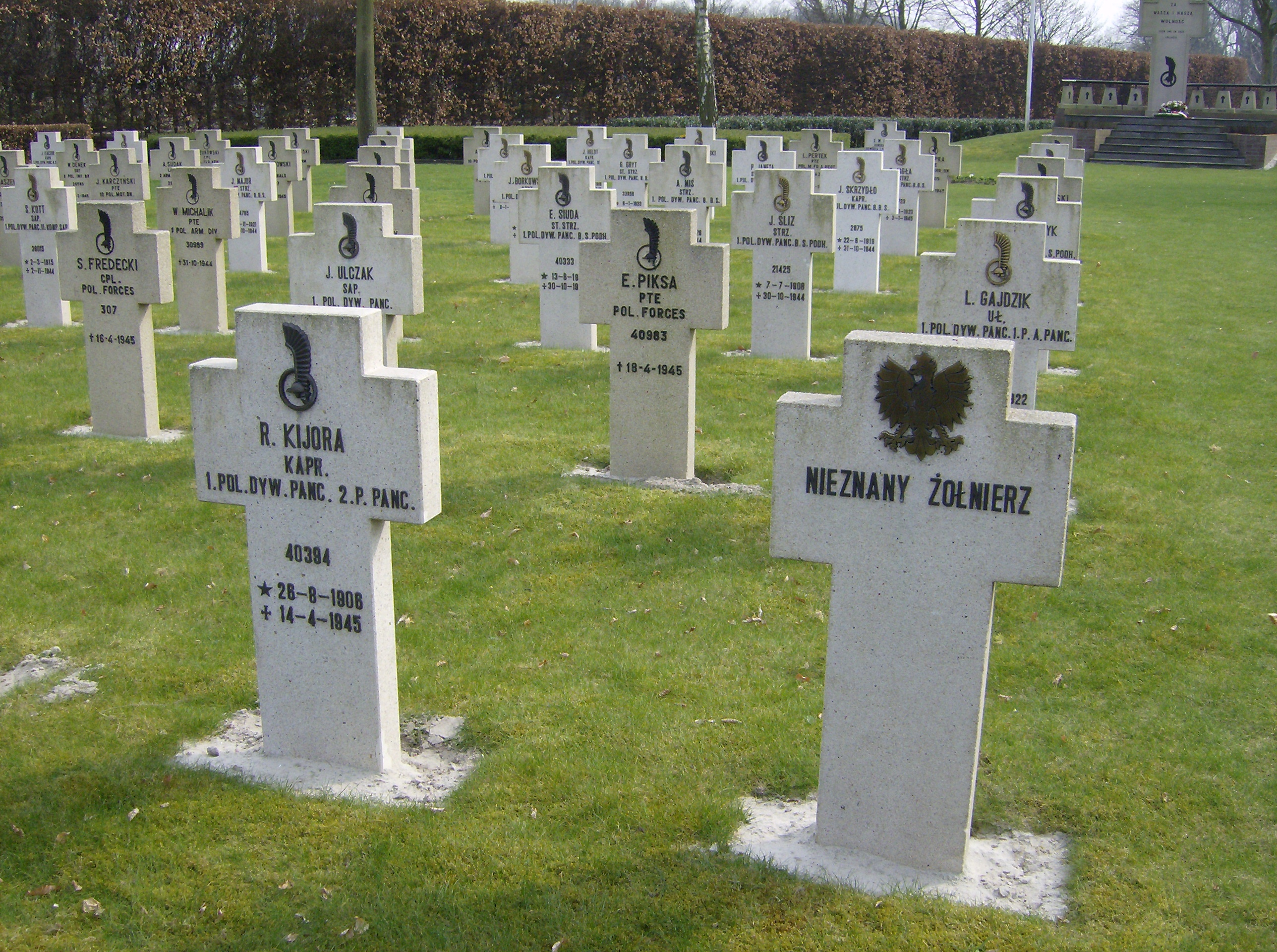
Pools Militair Field of Honour Breda

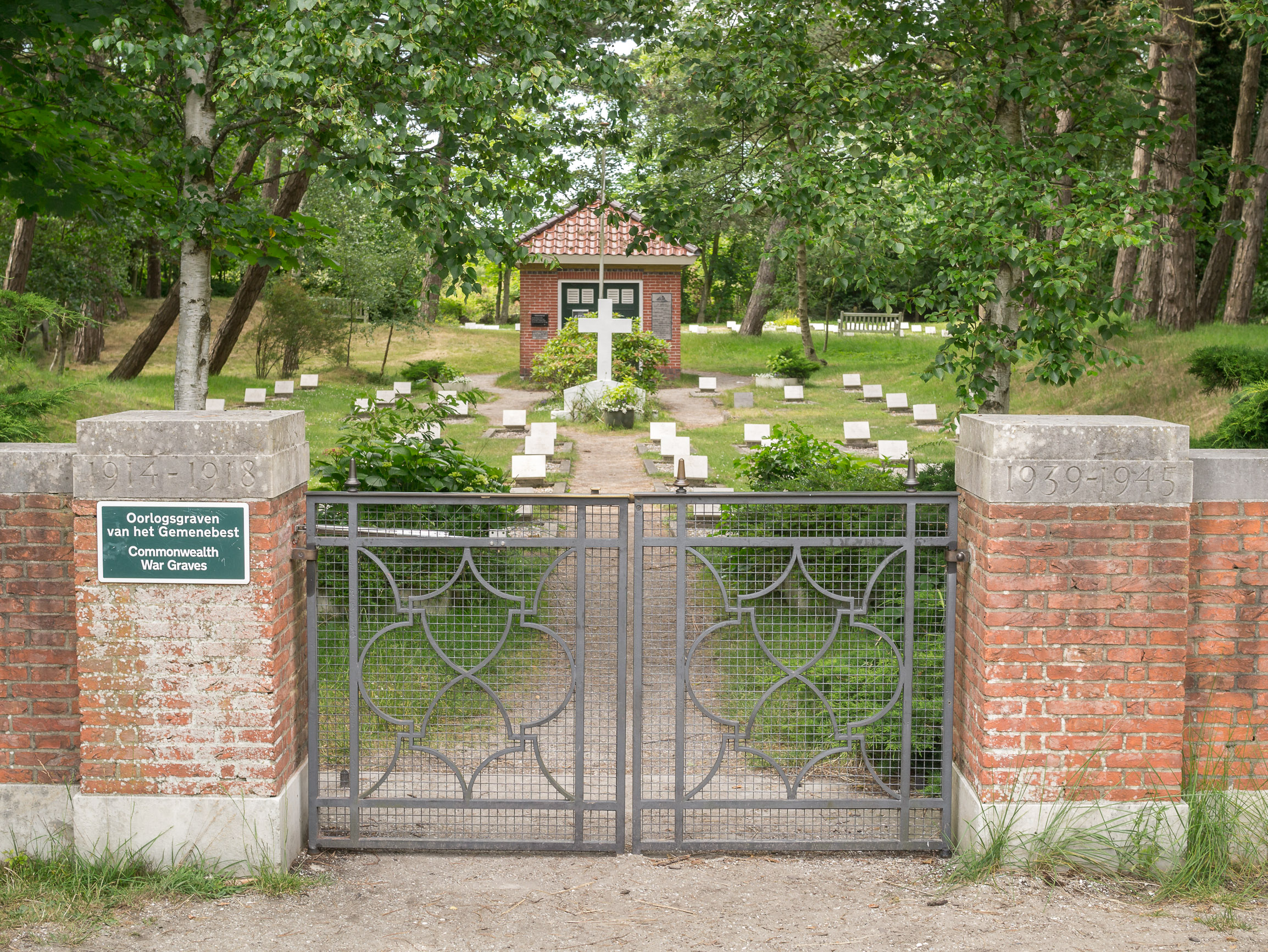
Vredenhof Schiermonnikoog

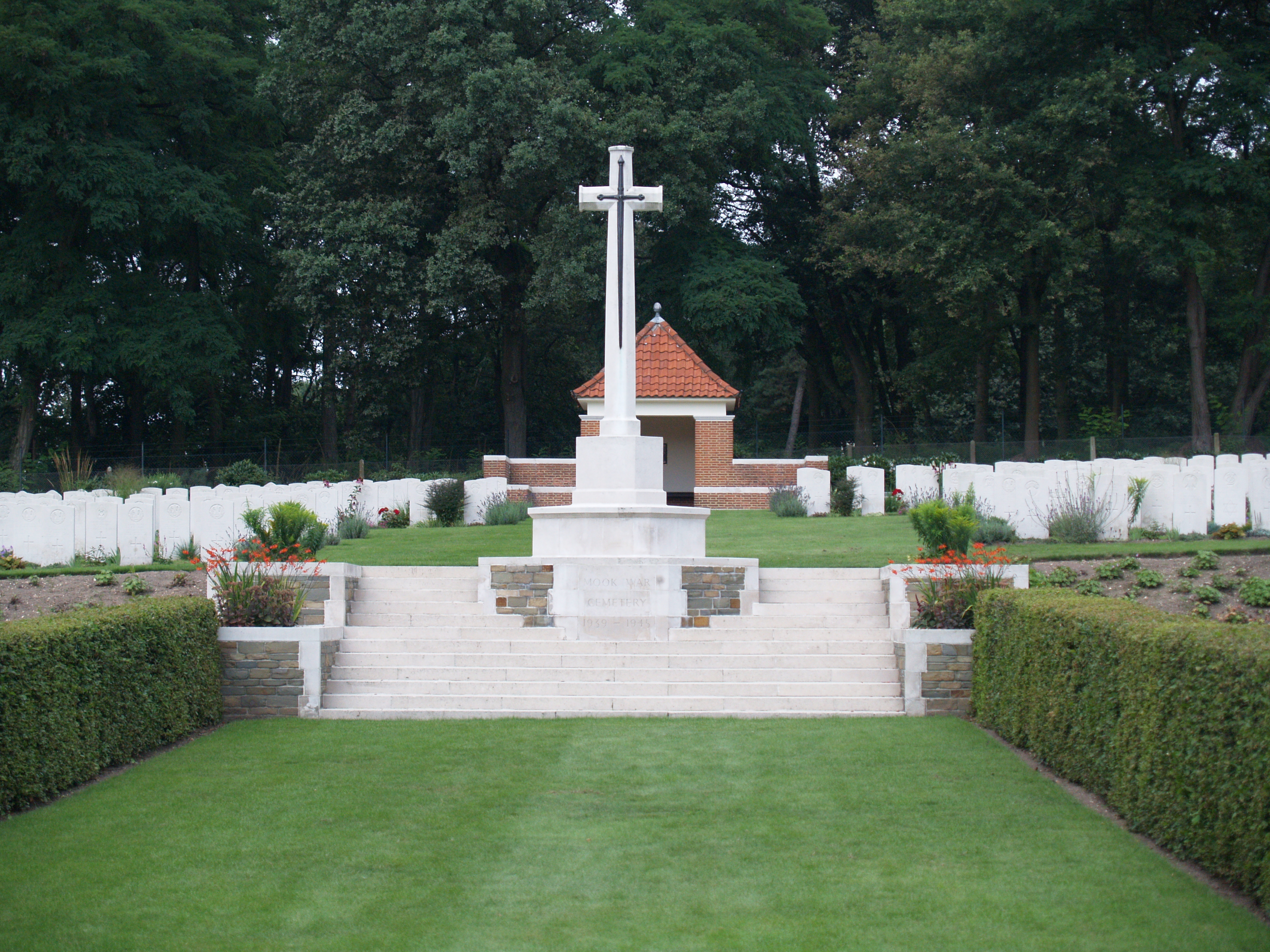
Mook war cemetery

=== German war graves ===
- Ysselsteyn German war cemetery – 31,585 combatants from Germany, Austria and the SU; Dutch and other SS members (such as Julius Dettmann, who had Anne Frank arrested), Dutch traitors and collaborators
- Vorden (gem. Lochem) General Cemetery – 10 soldiers
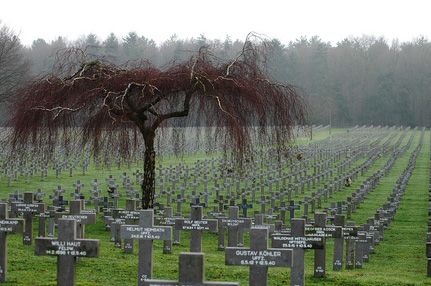
Ysselsteyn, German War Cemetery

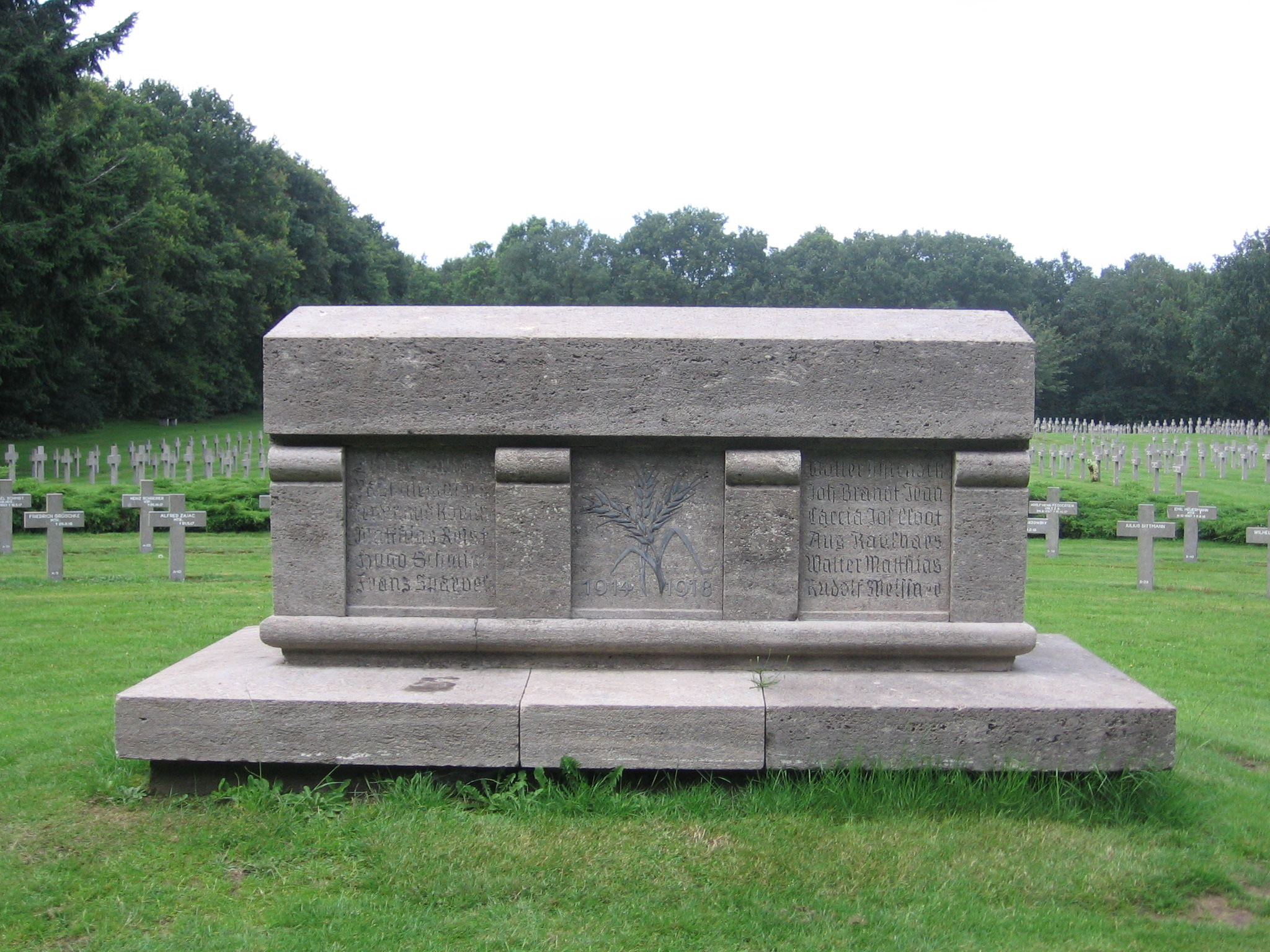
Monument at Ysselsteyn, German War Cemetery

=== Cemeteries with Commonwealth War Graves ===
If Allied war graves are present at a cemetery, a green identification plate is placed at the entrance carrying the text: Oorlogsgraven van het Gemenebest (Commonwealth War Graves)

== Memorial carillons ==
After launching Operation Barbarossa, the supply chain of metal from the Soviet Union to Nazi Germany collapsed. The German regime orchestrated the systematic confiscation of bells across Europe, starting with Germany itself. Bells were categorized by historical value and confiscated from youngest to oldest until the country ran out. It then looked to seize bells from the occupied Netherlands, which fought to preserve as many of its swinging bells and its carillons (musical instruments of bells) as possible. Between 1938 and 1945, 175,000 European bells were stolen and stored in "bell cemeteries" (German: Glockenfriedhöfe). Some 150,000 were sent to foundries and melted down for their copper. British investigators claimed every single bell was taken out of the Netherlands, with only 300 surviving their stay in the bell cemeteries. As a result of the destruction of this cultural heritage, many chose to memorialize the war with a carillon, often as a replacement for the one lost. The musical instrument became associated with world peace following World War I. The Network of War Memorial and Peace Carillons tracks carillons that where built in the name of peace and as a memorial for World Wars I and II. In the Netherlands, it identifies 8 installations as World War II memorials:

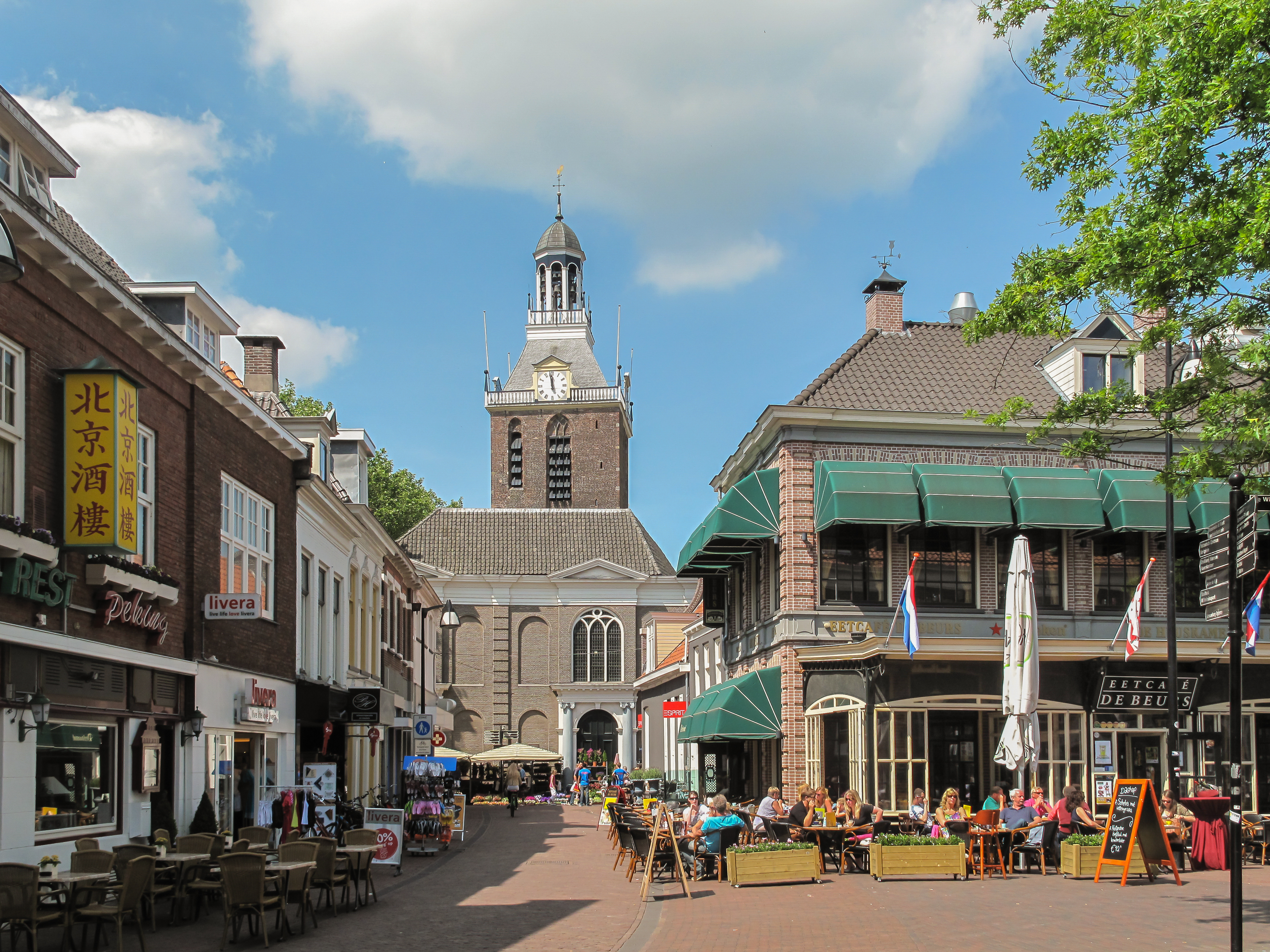
The tower of Meppel in 2011

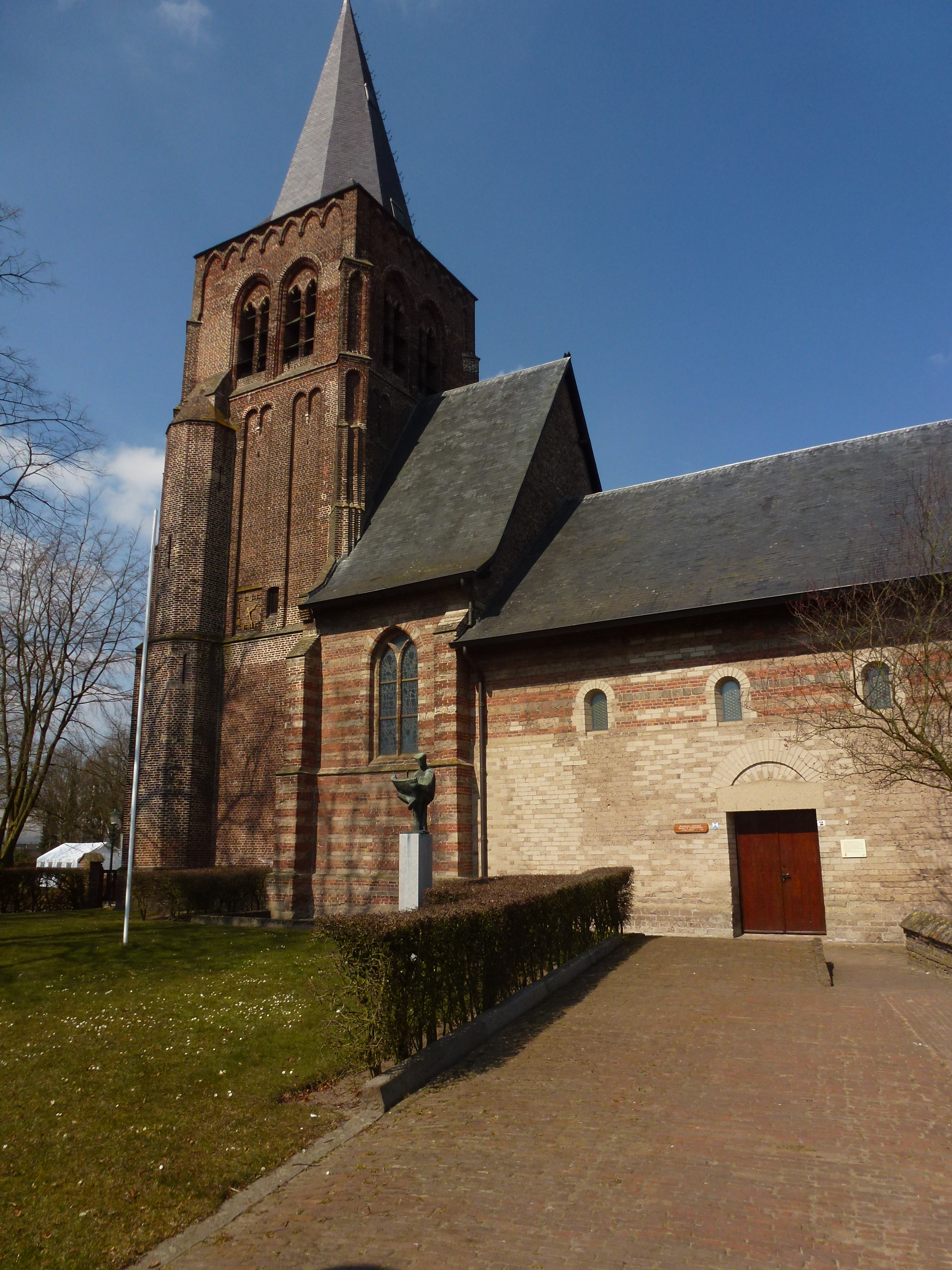
The tower of St Willibord Church in 2013

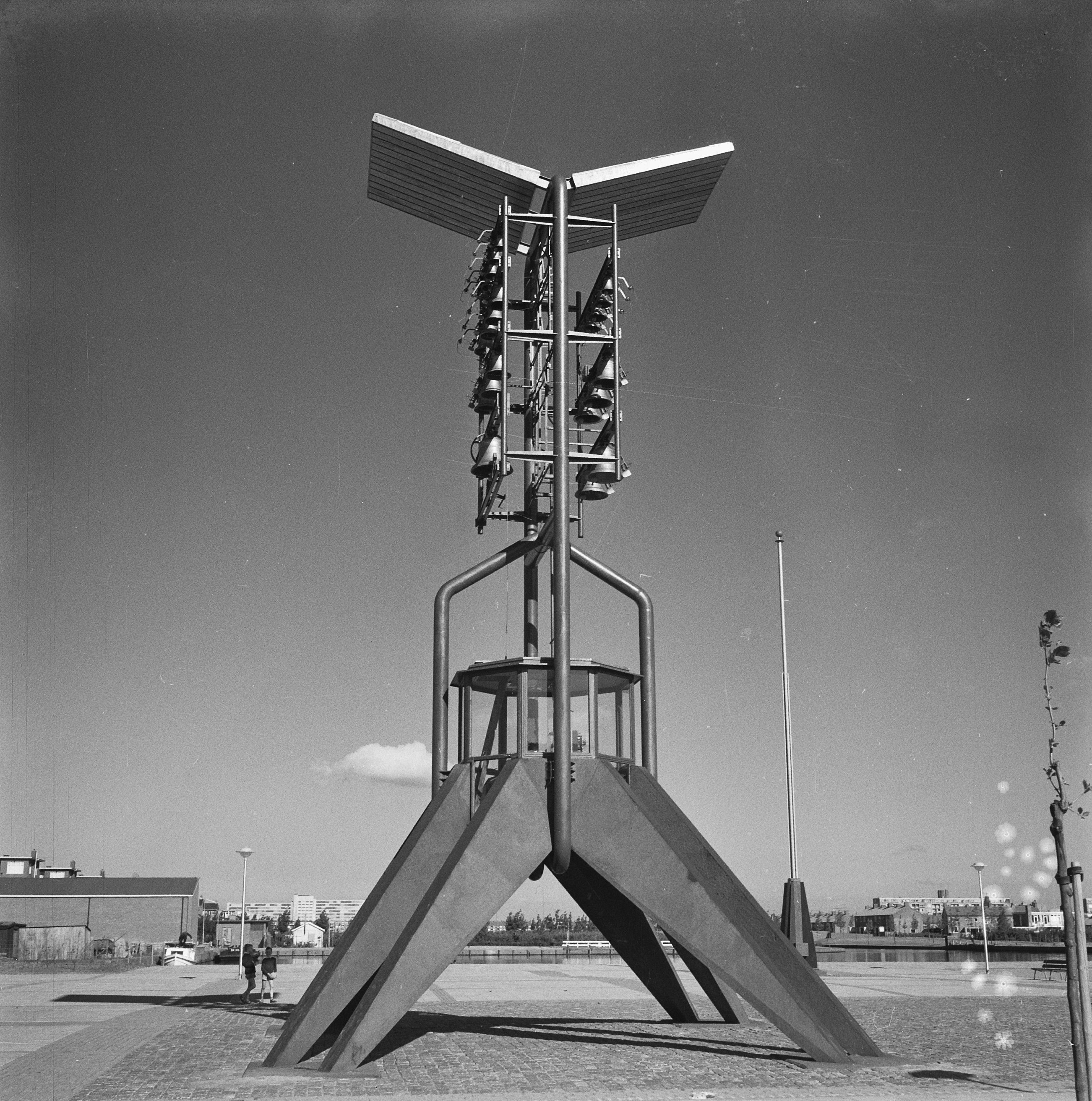
Amsterdam's Freedom Carillon in 1961

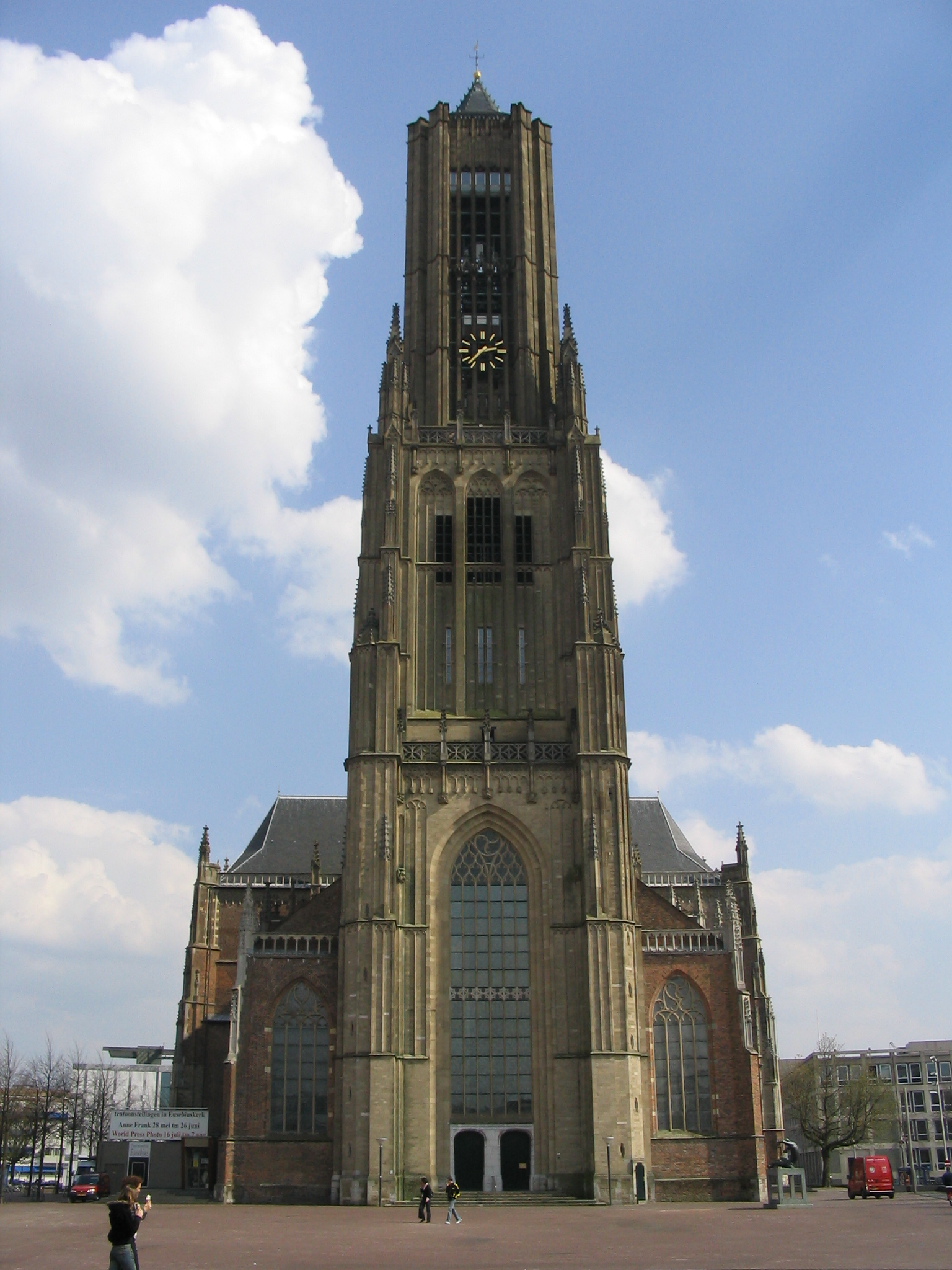
St Eusebius' Church, Arnhem in 2005

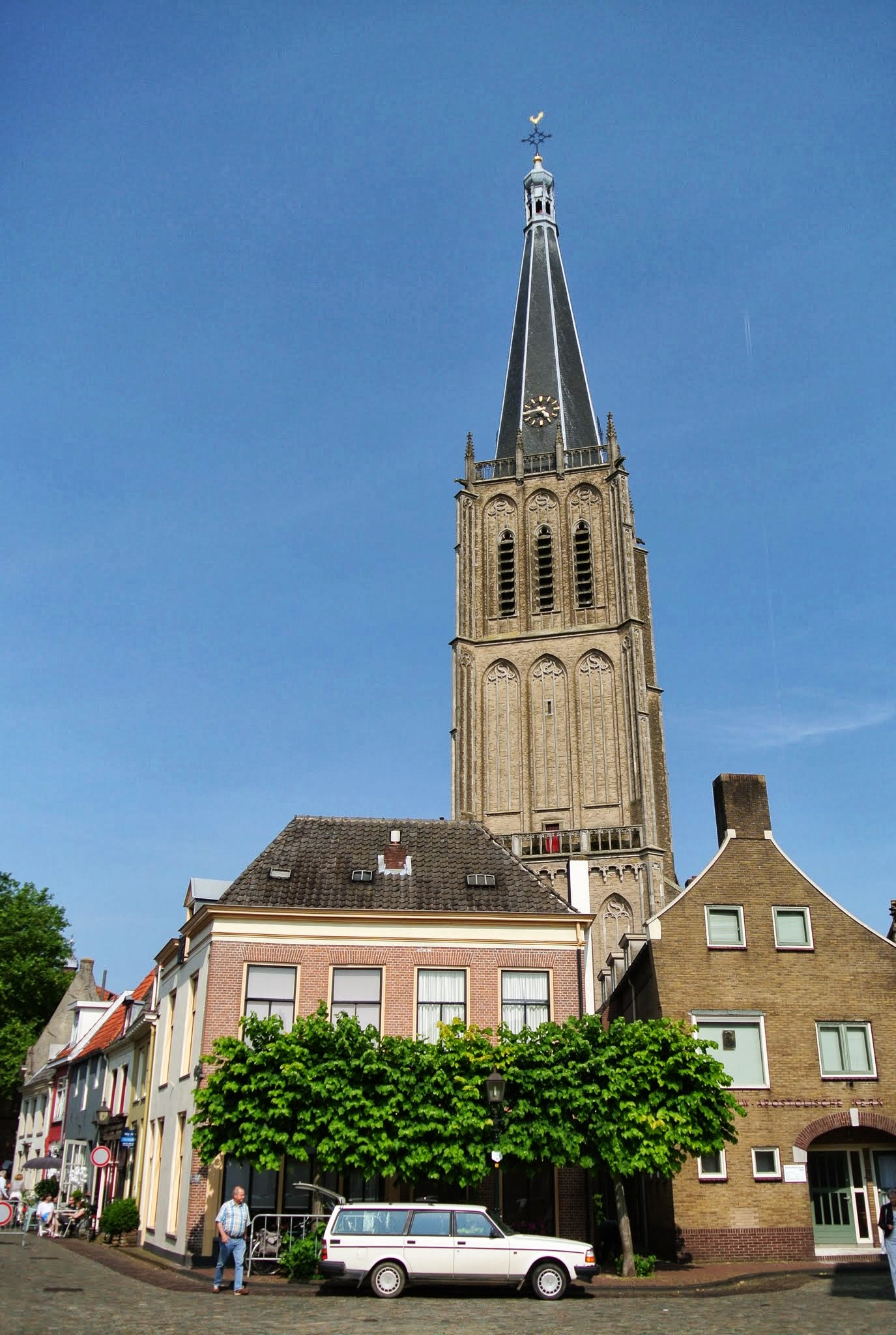
The tower of the Doesburg Martinikerk in 2013

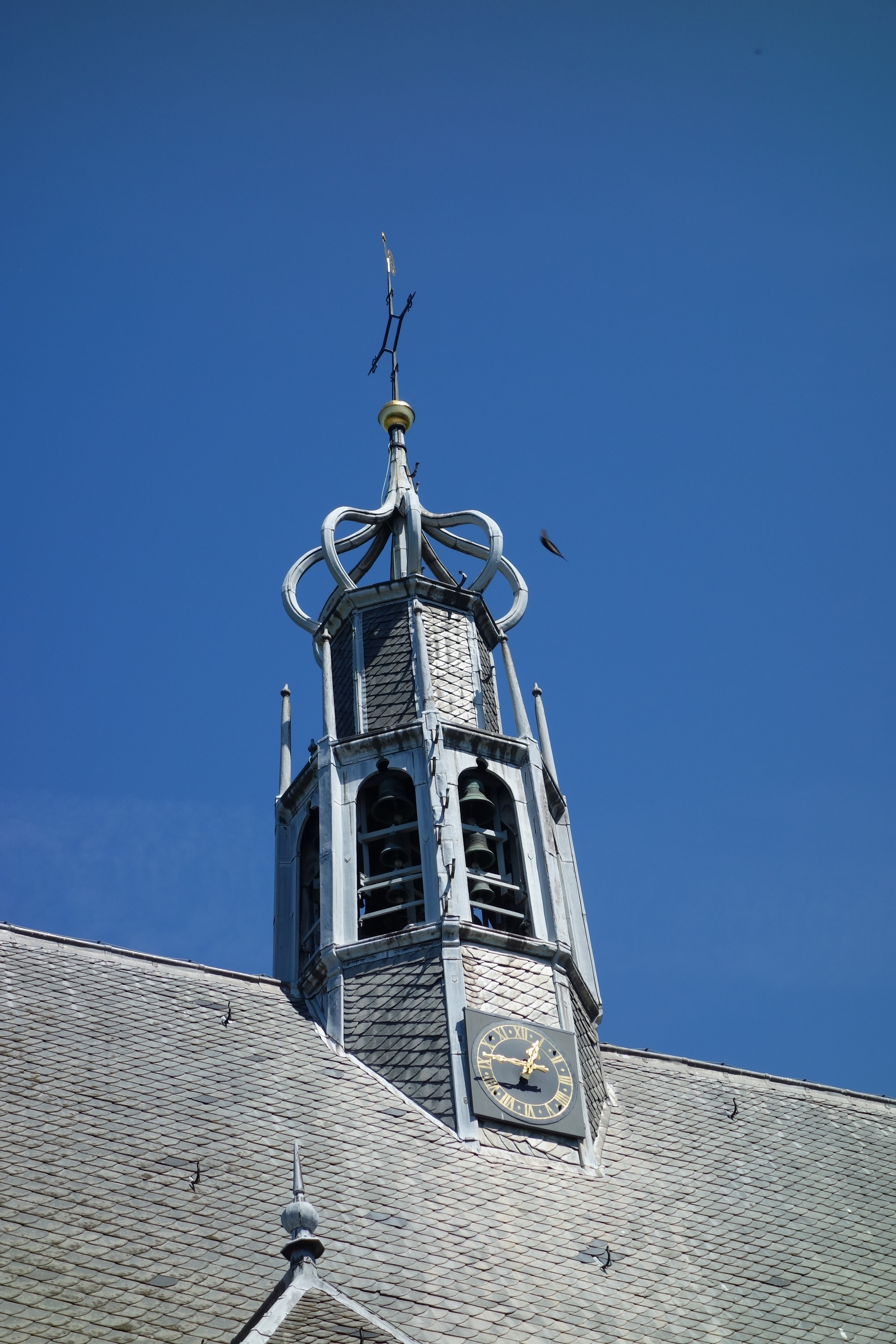
The tower of the Ruïnekerk in 2017

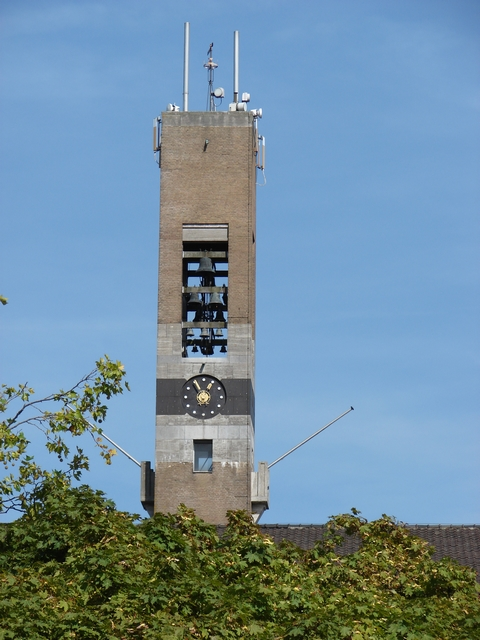
The Oosterbeek carillon in 2008

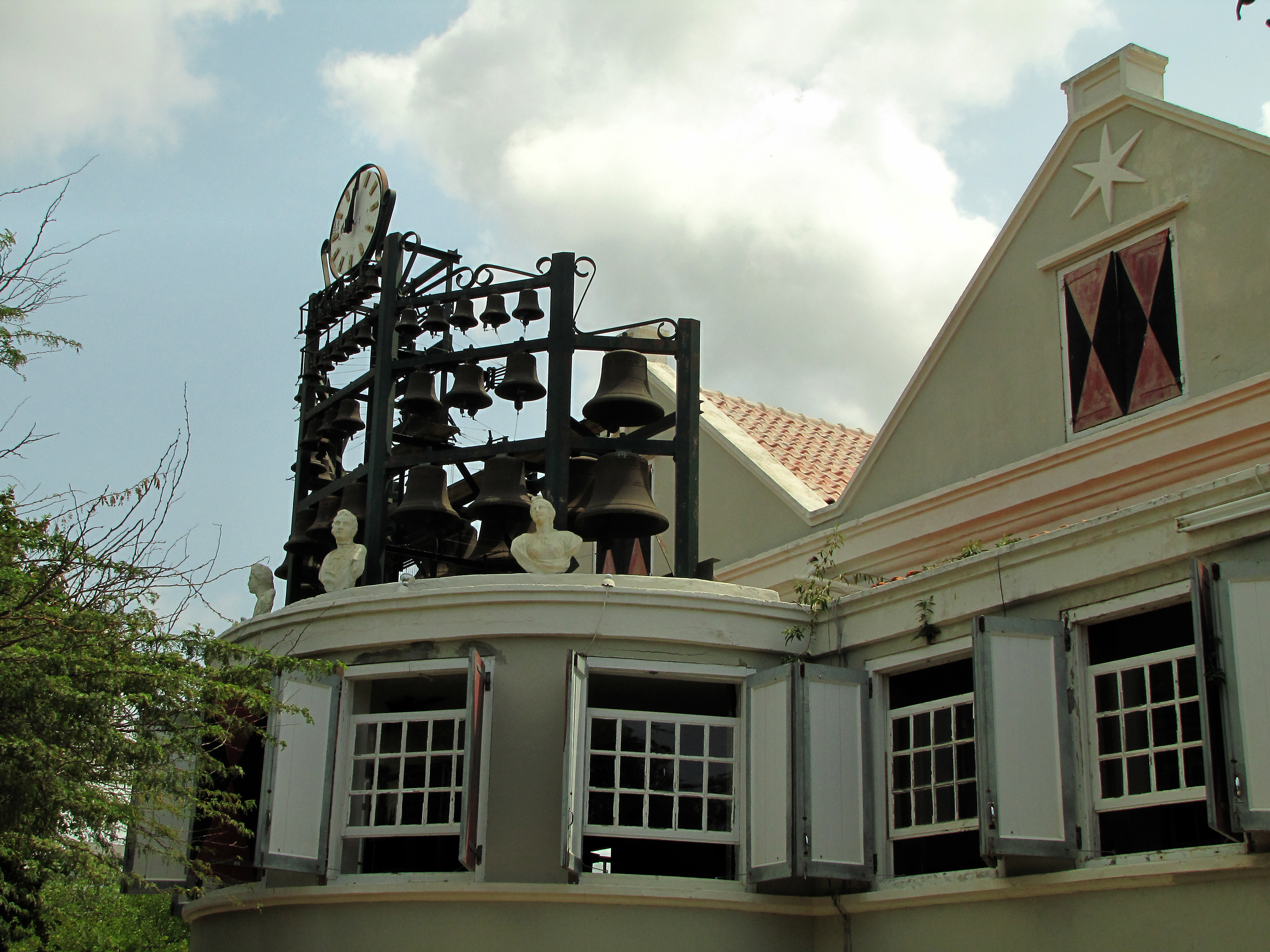
The carillon of the Curaçao Museum in 2010
- In 1949, a committee of residents was created to memorialize the suffering of the people of Meppel during the war and to celebrate its liberation on 13 April 1945. The committee fundraised donations for a "resistance monument" in Wilhelmina Park and carillon in the Tower of Meppel; the city funded the rest. Both monuments were dedicated on 13 April 1949. The carillon consisted of 40 bells that were cast by the Van Bergen bellfoundry, several of which had the names of the donors inscribed onto them. Due to their suboptimal quality, the instrument underwent several renovations and replacements over the next 30 years.
- Shortly before the end of the war, a North Brabant historical society began working to convert part of St. Willibrord Church in Waalre and its tower into a memorial for Brabant soldiers and resistance fighters. A fundraising campaign for a memorial carillon began in 1949, and a 35-bell instrument was dedicated in 1950. It is played every year during memorial services in May and September. In 2007, the carillon was enlarged with two additional bells.
- While not in the country of the Netherlands but rather within the Kingdom of the Netherlands, the city of Willemstad in Curaçao installed a 47-bell memorial carillon on the roof of the Curaçao Museum in 1951. Several bells were dedicated to Curaçaoans: Charles Debrot, who was killed by German paratroopers; Boy Ecury, a member of the Dutch resistance who was captured by the Gestapo; Jan Haayen, who died at the Java Sea during actions against Japan; George Maduro, who died in a Nazi concentration camp. Three bells were named after Dutch ships that sank: Dutch ships Leticia, Lucrecia and Rosalia.
- In 1949, Dutch journalist and politician Gerrit Jan van Heuven Goedhart put forward the idea to create a "Freedom Carillon" through the National Remembrance Committee of which he was a part. Donations were solicited from all Dutch people and a 23-bell carillon was constructed by Van Bergen bellfoundry in 1952. The city of Amsterdam was selected as its home, and it was inaugurated by Queen Juliana in 1961. It was enlarged to 31 bells in 1995. The carillon was initially intended to play music of the Dutch resistance on a daily basis, but this was not carried out.
- St Eusebius' Church in Arnhem had a 32-bell Hemony carillon hanging in its tower since 1652. It and the church were largely destroyed in 1944 during the Battle of Arnhem. Petit & Fritsen constructed a new, 49-bell carillon for the reconstructed church between 1958 and 1964. Since then, the carillon became associated with the yearly war memorial services held each May. In 1994, 50 years after the Battle of Arnhem, four bass bells were added to the instrument, with the largest funded by several English organizations. One of the 1994 bells features a quote from the book and film A Bridge Too Far.
- The Martinikerk in Doesburg had a small, two-octave Hemony carillon hanging in its tower since 1655. On 15 April 1945, German forces blew up the tower, destroying the carillon. Only 8 of the 23 bells survived the blast, and were later included in a new carillon of 49 bells, which was constructed in 1965. The lowest four bass bells, all new, each were cast with the name of a person who contributed to world peace after the war – Queen Wilhelmina of the Netherlands, Pope John XXIII, U.S. president John F. Kennedy, and European statesman Robert Schuman – and one of their significant quotes on peace. It was dedicated on May 5, 1965 (Dutch Liberation Day). In 2015, the carillon was expanded with another bass bell, this time dedicated to South African activist and political leader Nelson Mandela.
- In 1967, a committee formed to explore the possibilities of installing a carillon in Bergen, and it chose to have Petit & Fritsen construct a new, 26-bell instrument in the village's Ruïnekerk. The bells were dedicated to 250 soldiers from the United Kingdom, Canada, Australia, New Zealand, Poland, Czechoslovakia, and those of unknown origin, who were buried at Bergen General Cemetery. They also purchased a 27th bell, which does not ring and instead functions as a time capsule. The carillon was inaugurated on May 5, 1970, the 25th anniversary of Dutch Liberation Day.
- In 1965, the village of Oosterbeek established a committee to raise funds for a memorial carillon. Donations were raised locally from British military units who fought in and around Oosterbeek during the Battle of Arnhem. By 1966, the village dedicated a small, automatic carillon of 23 bells decorated with the insignia of the British Airborne Forces. Fundraising continued for several years to upgrade the carillon to 37 bells and include a manual keyboard. It was inaugurated on September 21, 1974, the 30th anniversary of the Battle of Arnhem. Since 2017, the bell tower is frequently lit up with the colors of the British Airborne Forces.

== Other memorials ==
- Fusilladeplaats Rozenoord, Amsterdam
