= Uden War Cemetery =

WWII CWGC cemetery in The Netherlands

- Commonwealth War Graves Commission
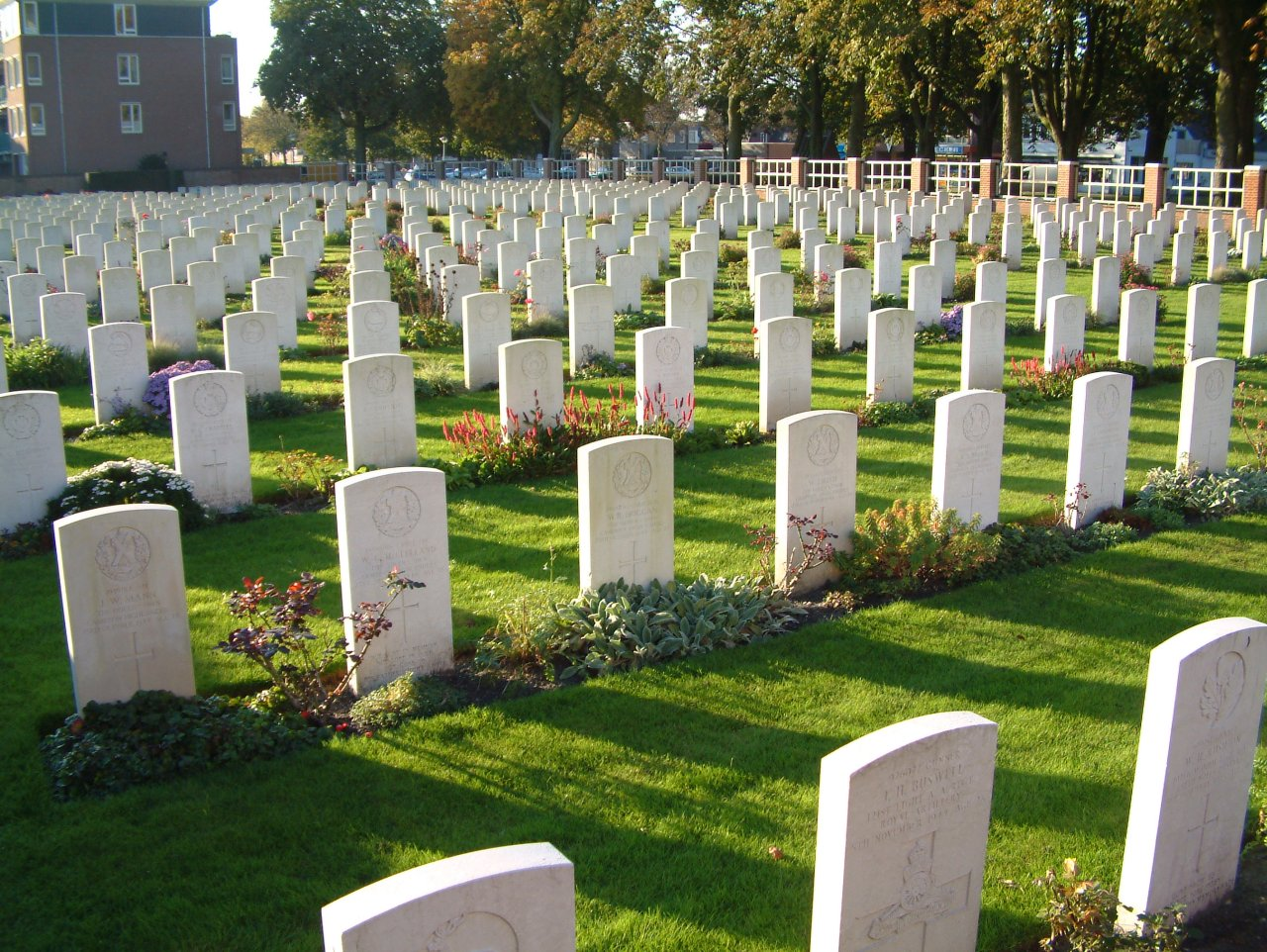
- The Uden War Cemetery
- Used for those deceased 1939–1945
- Established: 1960
- Location: 51°39′50″N 05°36′45″E near Uden, Netherlands.
- Total burials: 701
- Unknowns: 2

Burials by nation
- United Kingdom: 618; Canada: 53; Australia: 19; New Zealand: 7 Poland: 2

Burials by war
- World War II

The Uden War Cemetery is a Commonwealth War Graves Commission cemetery in Uden, the Netherlands. It was established in 1960 and is home to 703 graves from the Second World War.

== History ==
After the Battle of the Netherlands the country was occupied by the Germans. During the occupation allied casualties were buried in the parish priest's garden. In 1943 the municipality acquired the Roman Catholic Cemetery which was out of use since 1918. After the war about 100 graves were moved from the garden into the new cemetery. Many other graves from the region were also moved to the cemetery. Most of the buried are casualties from Operation Market Garden.

== Cemetery ==
The cemetery contains 701 graves and a Cross of Sacrifice, surrounded by a brick wall. The municipality of Uden has designated the cemetery a municipal monument.

== Notable burials ==
- Major Walter Long, 2nd Viscount Long
- Captain Prince Dimitri Galitzine

== See also ==
- World War II memorials and cemeteries in the Netherlands
