= Swartbroek =

Swartbroek Swartbrook
- Village
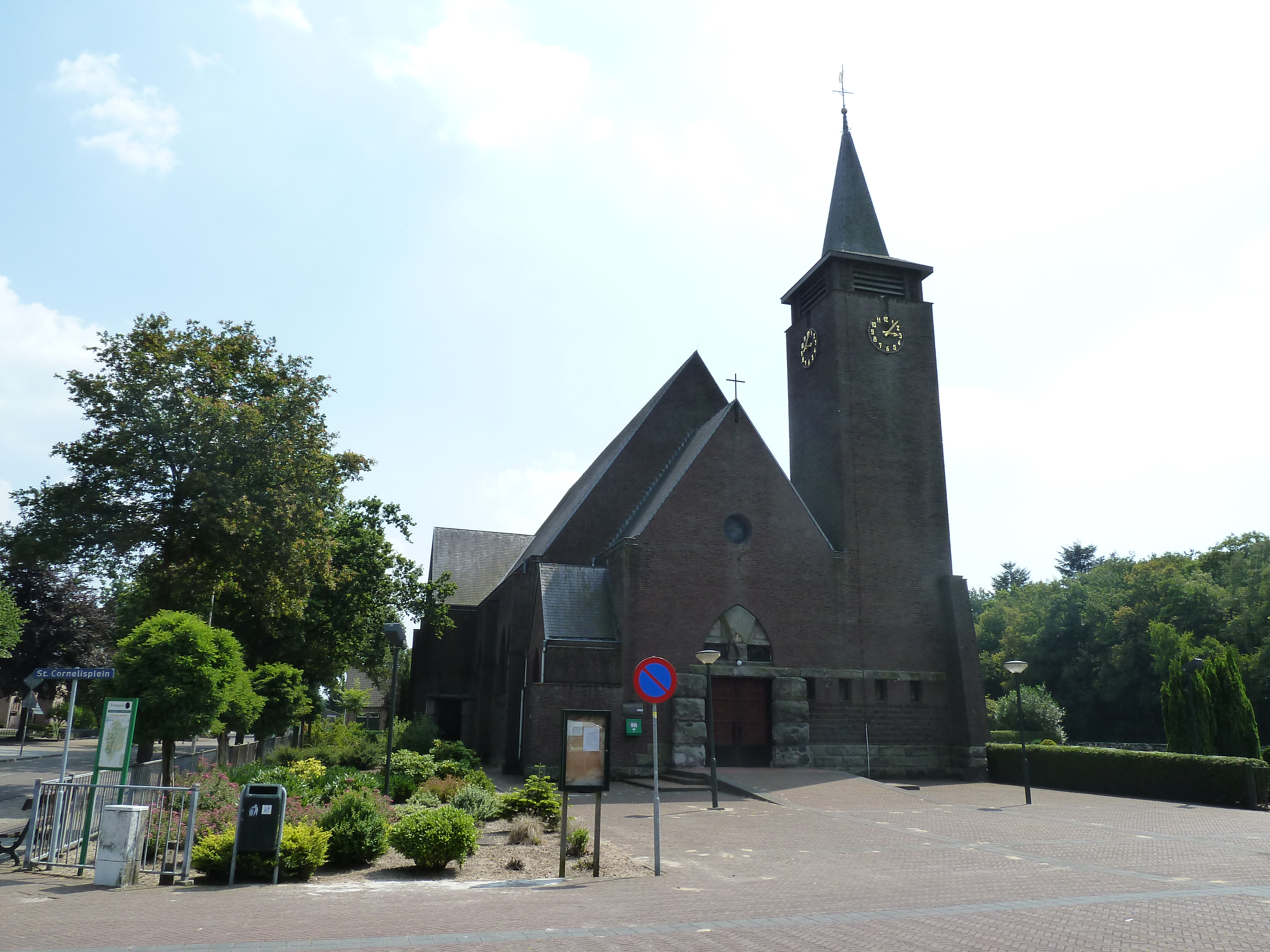
- St Cornelius Church

- Location in the Netherlands Location in the province of Limburg in the Netherlands
- Coordinates: 51°14′N 5°46′E
- Country: Netherlands
- Province: Limburg
- Municipality: Weert

Area
  - Total: 6.98 km^{2} (2.69 sq mi)
- Elevation: 32 m (105 ft)

Population (2021)
  - Total: 870
  - Density: 120/km^{2} (320/sq mi)
- Time zone: UTC+1 (CET)
  - Summer (DST): UTC+2 (CEST)
- Postal code: 6005
- Dialing code: 0495
- Major roads: A2 N280

Swartbroek (Dutch pronunciation: [ˈsʋɑrdbruk]; Limburgish: Zwertbrook [ˈzwe̞ʀdbʀoːk]) is a village in the Netherlands, in the municipality of Weert in the province of Limburg.

The village was first mentioned in the 16th century as Swartbroeck, and means "black swampy land".

Swartbroek was home to 276 people in 1840. In 1925, the St Cornelius Church was built. The grist mill De Hoop was built in 1905 using material from a 1788 wind mill. Between 2011 and 2015, it was restored and still in active service.

== Gallery ==
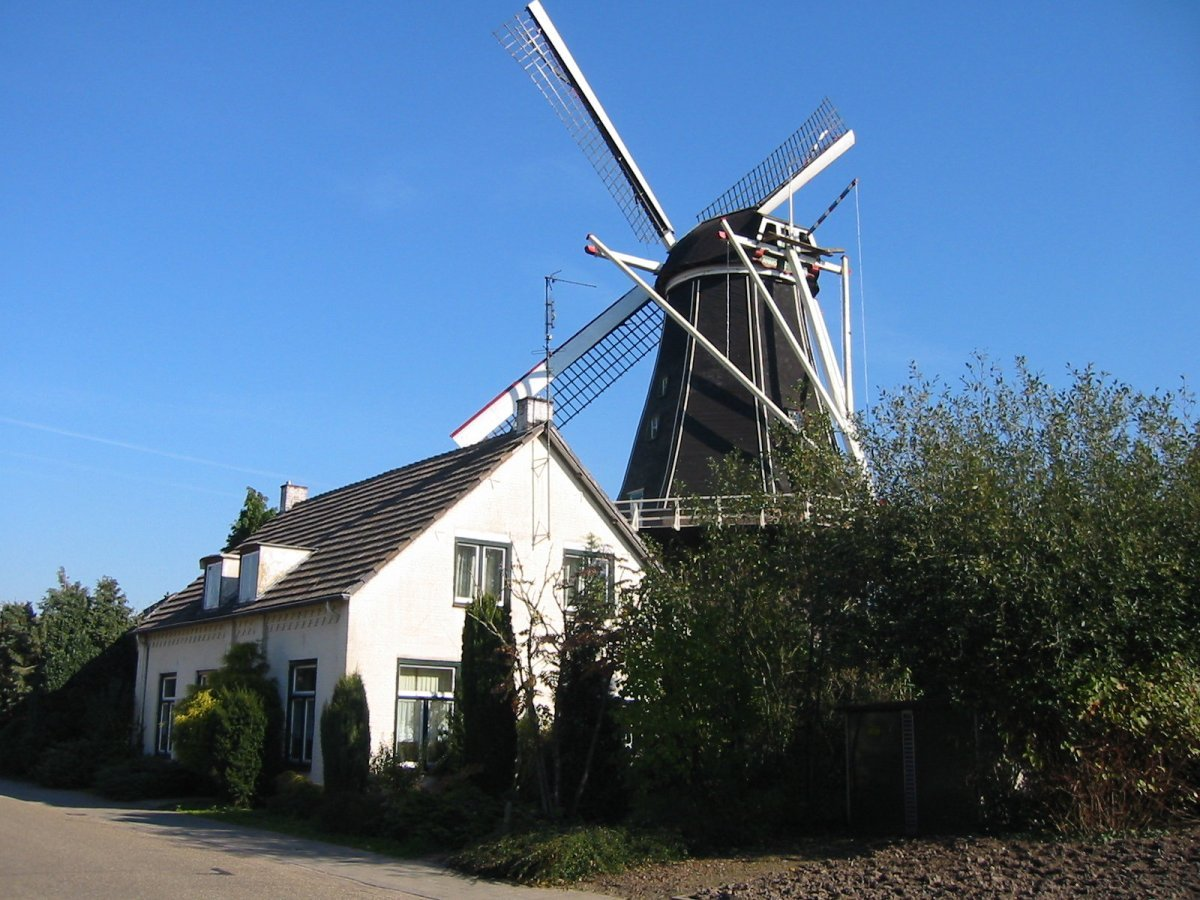
Windmill De Hoop

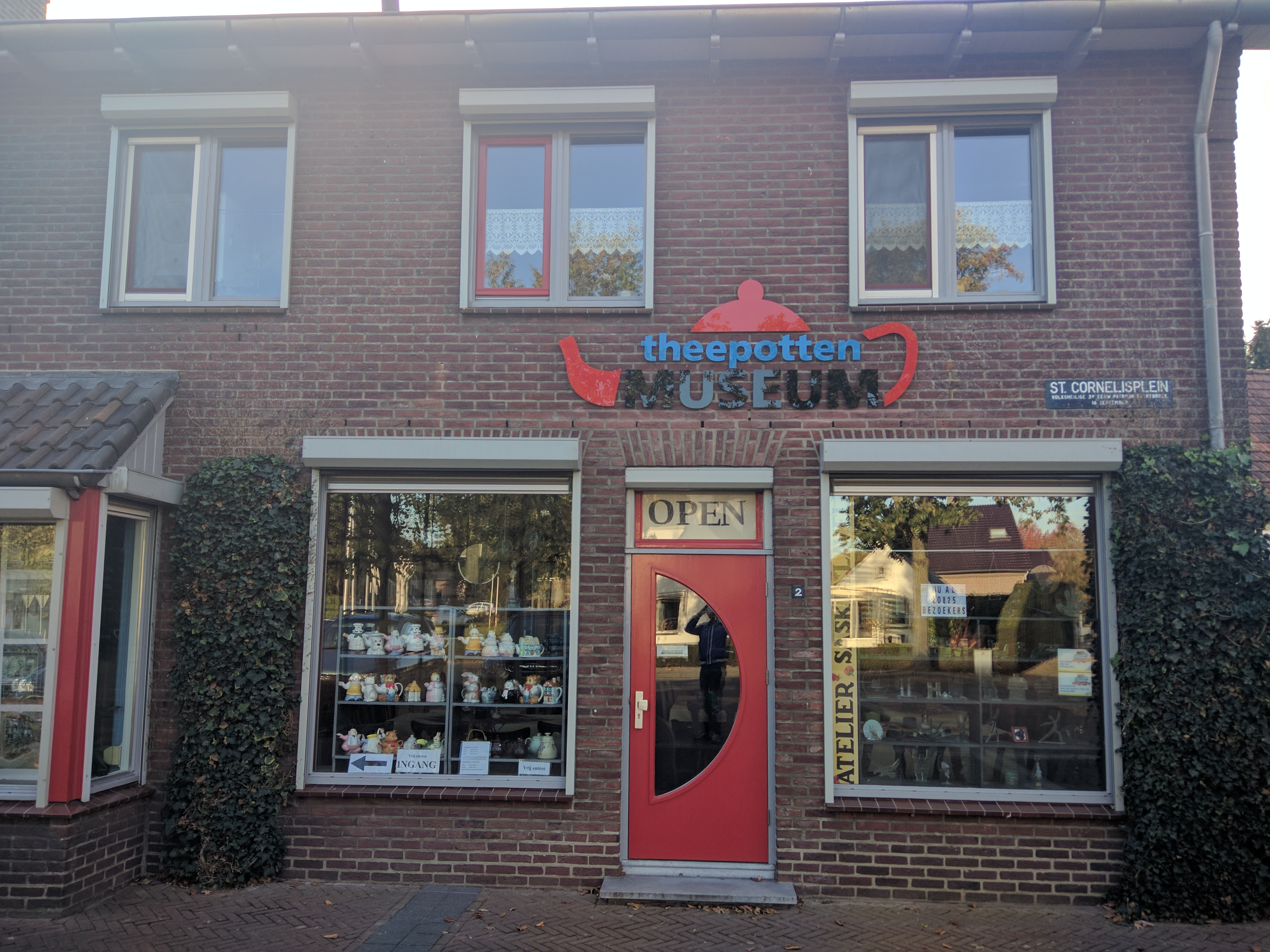
Tea pot museum
