= Concertgebouw, Amsterdam =

Concert hall in Amsterdam, Netherlands

Royal Concert Hall
- Koninklijk Concertgebouw
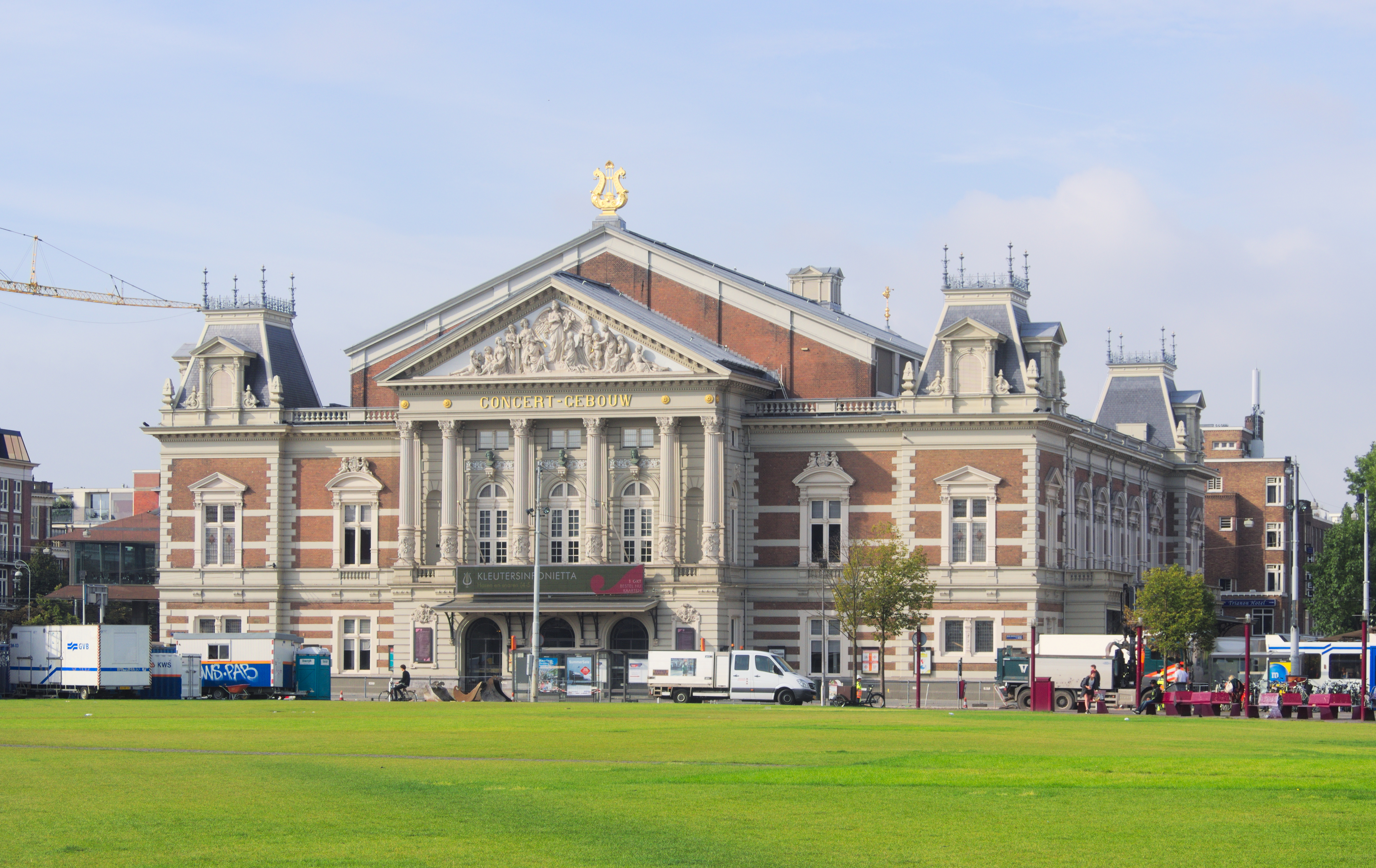

- Location within Amsterdam

General information
- Status: Completed
- Type: Concert hall
- Architectural style: Neoclassical
- Location: Museumplein, Concertgebouwplein 10; 1071 LN Amsterdam, Amsterdam, Netherlands
- Coordinates: 52.3563°N 4.8791°E
- Current tenants: Royal Concertgebouw Orchestra
- Construction started: 1883
- Completed: Late 1886
- Opened: 11 April 1888
- Renovated: July 1985 – April 1988
- Cost: 300,000 Dutch guilders
- Owner: Het Concertgebouw N.V. (privately owned)

Design and construction
- Architect: Adolf Leonard van Gendt
- Designations: Protected monument

Renovating team
- Architect: Pi de Bruijn

Other information
- Seating type: Theatre
- Seating capacity: 1,974 (Main Hall); 437 (Recital Hall); 150 (Choir Hall)

Website
- Official website

The Royal Concertgebouw (Dutch: het Koninklijk Concertgebouw, pronounced [ət ˈkoːnɪŋklə kɔnˈsɛrtxəˌbʌu]) is a concert hall in Amsterdam, Netherlands. The Dutch term "concertgebouw" translates into English as "concert building". Its superb acoustics place it among the finest concert halls in the world, along with New York's Carnegie Hall, Boston's Symphony Hall and the Musikverein in Vienna.

In celebration of the building's 125th anniversary, Queen Beatrix bestowed the royal title "Koninklijk" upon the building on 11 April 2013, as she had on the Royal Concertgebouw Orchestra upon its 100th in 1988.

== History ==
The architect of the building was Adolf Leonard van Gendt, who was inspired by the Gewandhaus in Leipzig, built two years earlier (and destroyed in 1943).

Construction began in 1883 in a pasture that was then outside the city, in Nieuwer-Amstel, a municipality that in 1964 became Amstelveen. A total of 2,186 wooden piles, 12 to 13 metres (40 to 43 ft) long, were emplaced in the soil. The Concertgebouw was completed in late 1886, however due to the difficulties with the municipality of Nieuwer-Amstel – filling in a small canal, paving the access roads and installing street lights – the grand opening of the building was delayed.

The hall opened on 11 April 1888 with an inaugural concert, in which an orchestra of 120 musicians and a chorus of 500 singers participated, performing works of Wagner, Handel, Bach, and Beethoven. The resident orchestra of the Concertgebouw is the Royal Concertgebouw Orchestra (Koninklijk Concertgebouworkest), which gave its first concert in the hall on 3 November 1888, as the Concertgebouw Orchestra (Concertgebouworkest). For many decades from the 1950s to the present day the Netherlands Philharmonic Orchestra (previously the Amsterdam Philharmonic Orchestra) as well as the Radio Filharmonisch Orkest also provide their regular concert series in the Concertgebouw.

In 1896, most of the territory of Nieuwer-Amstel was ordered annexed, bringing the Concertgebouw to lie within Amsterdam.

Today, some 900 concerts and other events per year take place in the Concertgebouw, for a public of over 700,000, making it one of the most-visited concert halls in the world.

As of February 2014, the managing director of the Concertgebouw is Simon Reinink and the artistic director is Anneke Hogenstijn.

== Controversies ==
The 2025 Hanukkah concert at the Concertgebouw was cancelled over Shai Abramson’s status as the lead cantor of the Israeli Defense Forces (IDF). The Concertgebouw requested the organizers to replace what they saw as “a visible representative” of the IDF, which the hall's leadership stated “is actively involved in a controversial war”. The Chanukah Concert Foundation, which arranged the concert, came to a compromise with Concertgebouw and the concert was rescheduled as part of an afternoon-evening schedule that would combine a public show in the afternoon conducted by Jules van Hessen. There would be a private concert for already purchased tickets to see Abramson perform afterwards.

== Building ==
The Main Hall (Grote Zaal) seats 1,974, and is 44 metres (144 feet) long, 28 metres (92 feet) wide, and 17 metres (56 feet) high. Its reverberation time is 2.8 seconds without audience, 2.2 seconds with, making it ideal for the late Romantic repertoire such as Mahler. Although this characteristic makes it largely unsuited for amplified music, groups such as Led Zeppelin, Pink Floyd and The Who did perform there in the 1960s. In the Main Hall, there is a layer of dust in several places as removing this layer would impact the acoustics as they are now.

A smaller, oval-shaped venue, the Recital Hall (Kleine Zaal), is located behind the Main Hall. The Recital Hall is 20 metres (66 feet) long and 15 metres (49 feet) wide. Its more intimate space is well-suited for chamber music and lieder. The Recital Hall has 437 seats.

In 1983, the Concertgebouw was found to be sinking into the damp Amsterdam earth, with several inch-wide cracks appearing in the walls, so the hall embarked on extensive fundraising for renovations. Its difficult emergency restoration started in 1985, during which the 2,186 rotting wooden pilings were replaced with concrete pillars. Dutch architect Pi de Bruijn designed a modern annex for a new entrance and a basement to replace cramped dressing and rehearsal space.

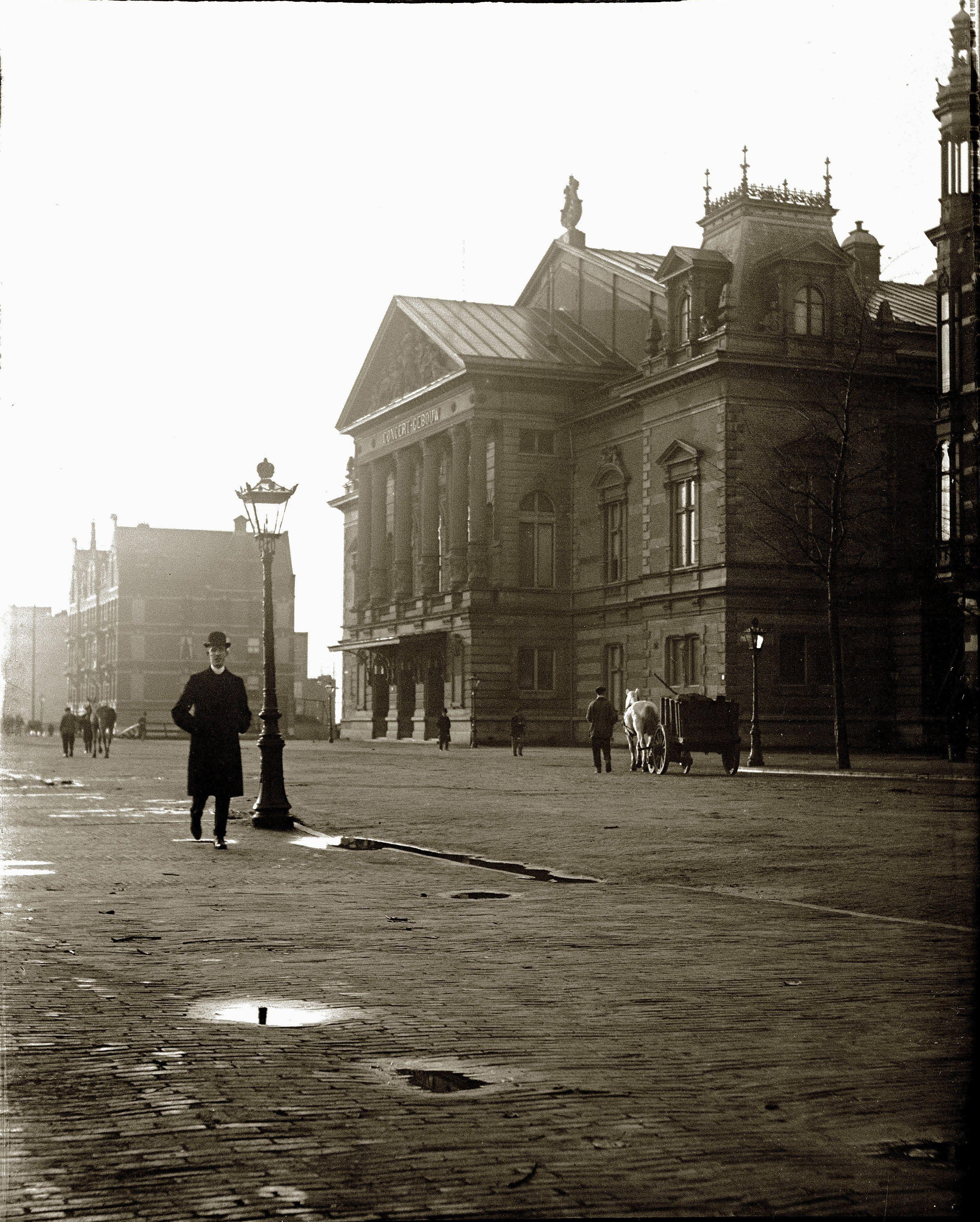
Concertgebouw in 1902, by Jacob Olie

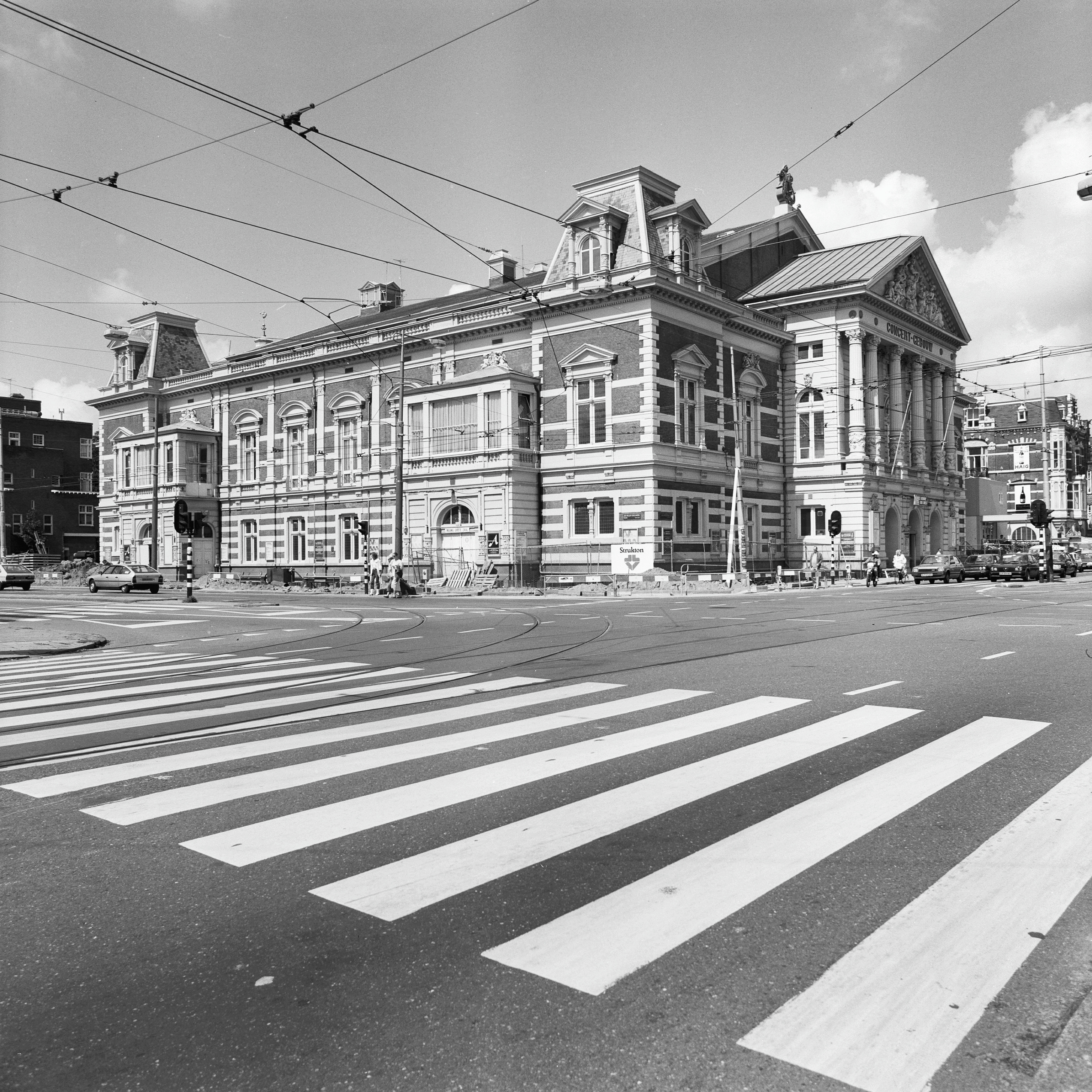
East side before its restoration in 1985

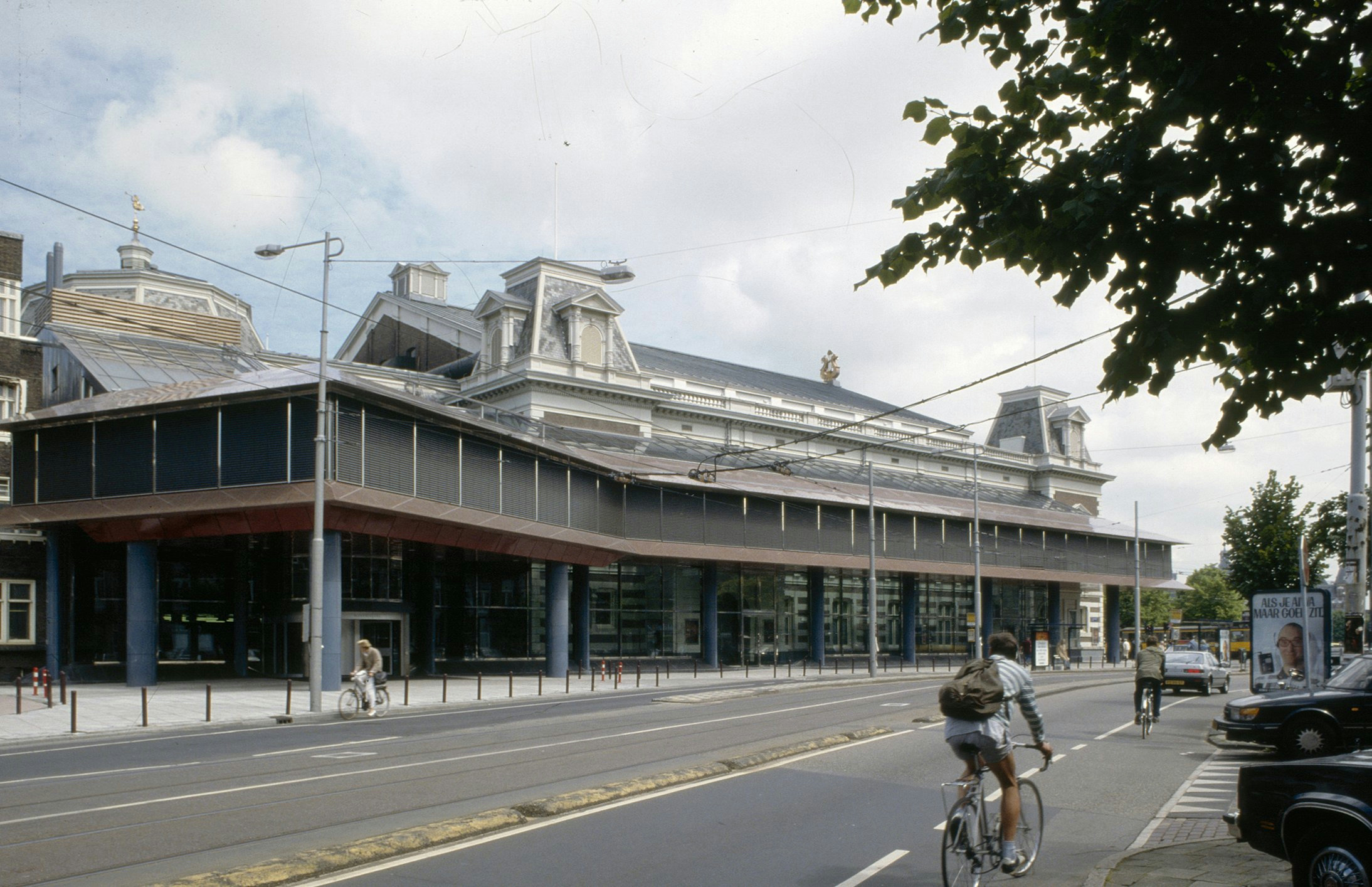
East side with the new entrance

== Organ ==
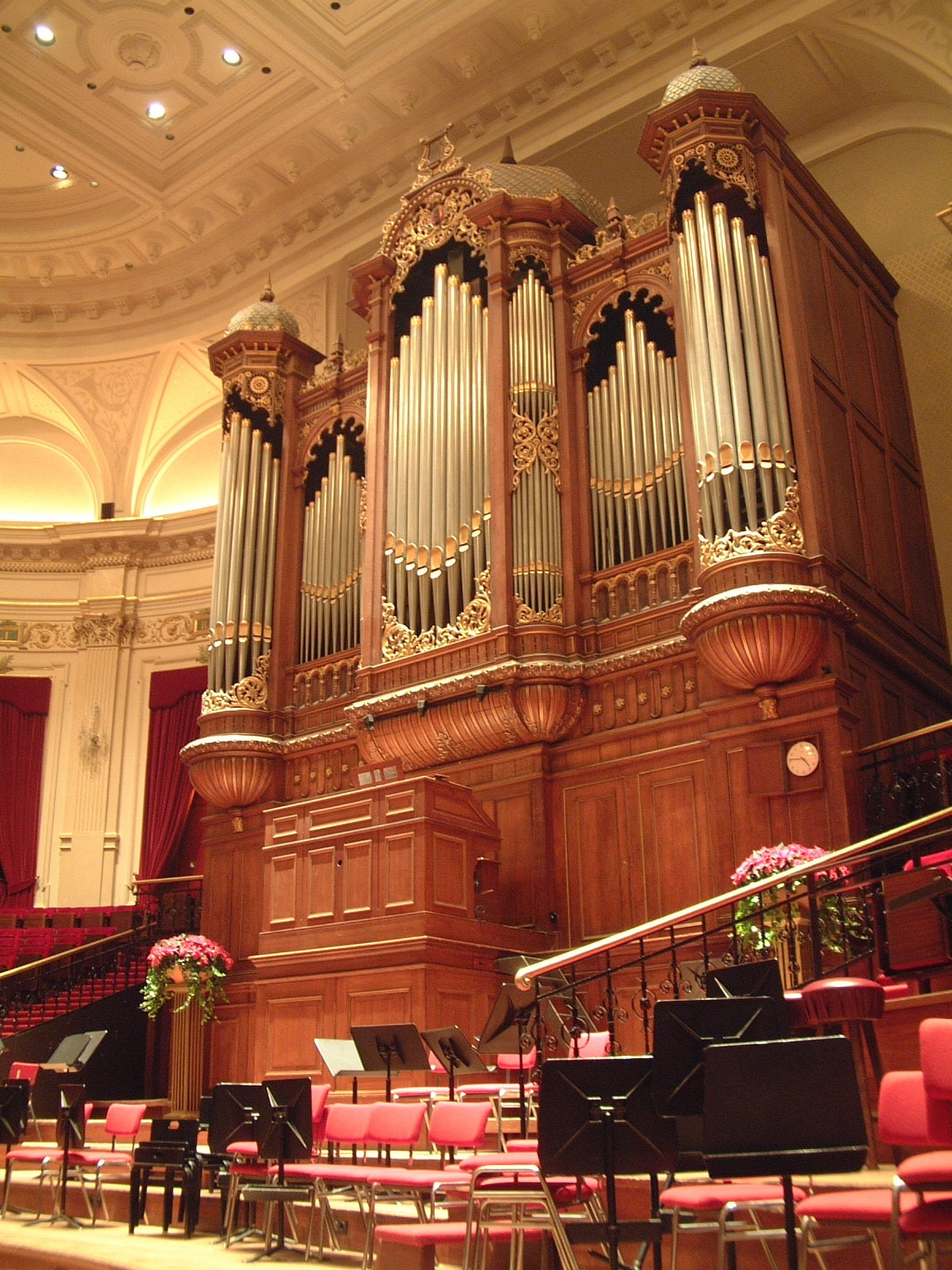
Organ in the Main Hall of the Concertgebouw

The organ was built in 1890 by the organ builder Michaël Maarschalkerweerd from Utrecht, and was renovated in the years 1990 to 1993 by the organ builder Flentrop. It has 60 registers on three divisions and pedal.

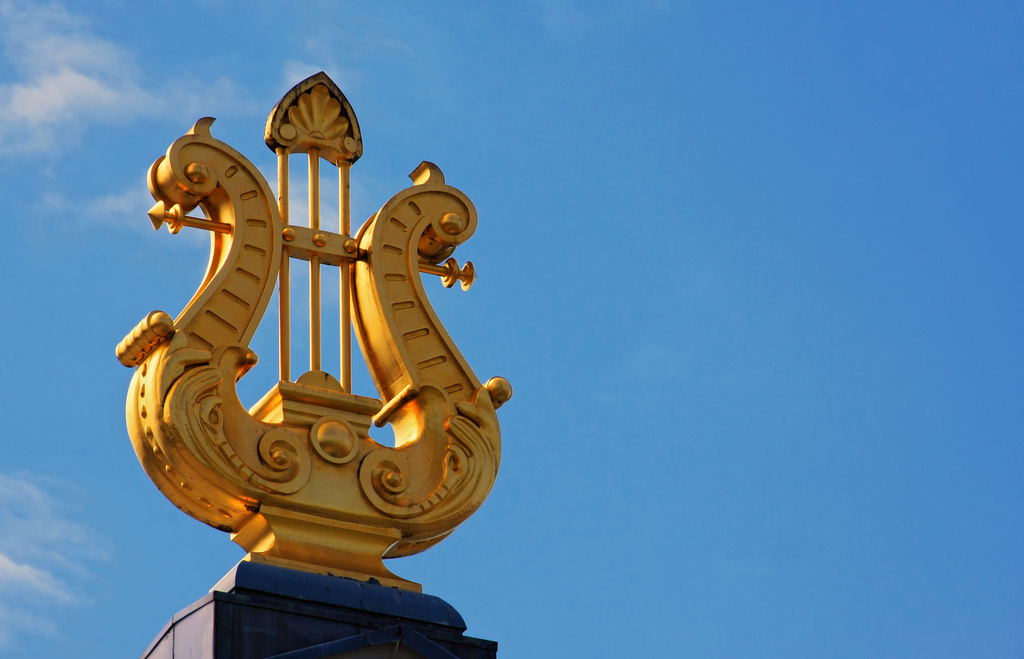
New gilded lyre on the roof

I Hauptwerk C–g^{3}
Prestant	16’
Bourdon	16’
Prestant	8’
Bourdon	8’
Flûte harmonique	8’
Violoncello	8’
Prestant	4’
Flûte octaviante	4’
Quint harm.	2^{2}/_{3}’
Quint	2^{2}/_{3}’
Octav harm.	2’
Octav	2’
Terz harm.	1^{3}/_{5}’
Mixtur IV–VI
Mixtur III–IV
Cornet V	8’
Bariton	16’
Trompet harm.	8’
Trompet	8’
Trompet	4’

II Schwellwerk C–g^{3}
Quintadeen	16’
Flûte harm.	8’
Hohlflöte	8’
Viola di Gamba	8’
Voix Céleste	8’
Flûte octaviante	4’
Quint	2^{2}/_{3}’
Flageolet harm.	2’
Terz	1^{3}/_{5}’
Piccolo	1’
Plein-jeu harm. IV-VI
Bombarde	16’
Trompet	8’
Basson-Hobo	8’
Vox humana	8’
Trompet harm.	4’
Tremulant

III Schwell-Positiv C–g^{3}
Zachtgedekt	16’
Prestant	8’
Rohrflöte	8’
Salicional	8’
Unda Maris	8’
Octav	4’
Fluit-dolce	4’
Violine	4’
Waldflöte	2’
Maarschalkje	1^{1}/_{3}’
Mixtur II–V
Trompet harm.	8’
Klarinet	8’
Tremulant

Pedalwerk C–g^{1}
Gedeckt Subbas	32’
Prinzipalbass	16’
Subbass	16’
Violon	16’
Quintbass	10^{2}/_{3}’
Flöte	8’
Violoncello	8’
Corni-dolce	4’
Basson	16’
Trombone	8’
Trompet	4’

- Couplers: II/I (also as Suboktavkoppel), III/I, III/II, I/P, II/P, III/P

== Names of composers in the Main Hall ==
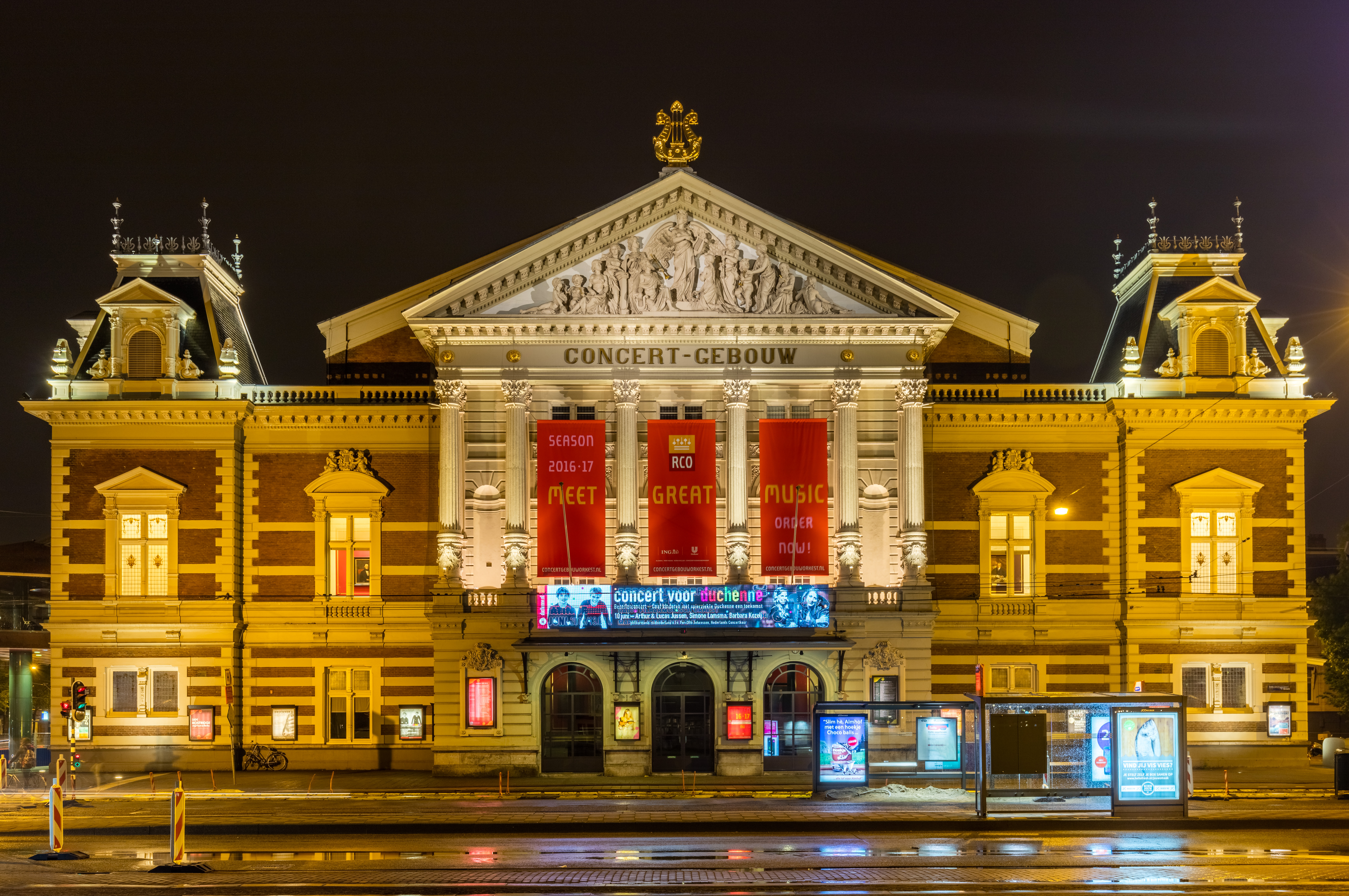
Concertgebouw at night, 2016

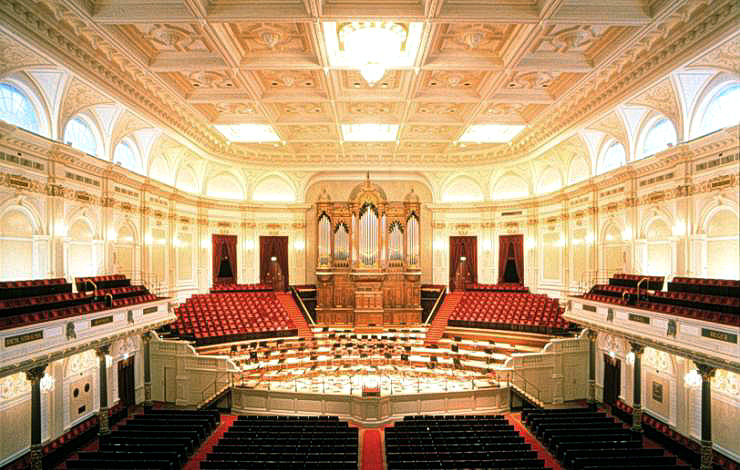
Main Hall (Grote Zaal) of the Concertgebouw

In the Main Hall, the surnames of the following 46 composers are displayed on the balcony ledges and on the walls:

- Bernard Zweers
- Anton Bruckner
- Gustav Mahler
- César Franck
- Alphons Diepenbrock
- Claude Debussy
- Cornelis Dopper
- Richard Strauss
- Julius Röntgen
- Béla Bartók
- Antonín Dvořák
- George Frideric Handel
- Jean-Baptiste Lully
- Domenico Scarlatti
- Wolfgang Amadeus Mozart
- Luigi Cherubini
- Carl Maria von Weber
- Hector Berlioz
- Frédéric Chopin
- Franz Liszt
- Richard Wagner
- Charles Gounod
- Johann Adam Reincken
- Cornelis Schuyt
- Jacob Obrecht
- Jan Pieterszoon Sweelinck
- Orlando di Lasso
- Johannes Wanning
- Jacobus Clemens non-Papa
- Pyotr Ilyich Tchaikovsky
- Igor Stravinsky
- Johan Wagenaar
- Max Reger
- Maurice Ravel
- Willem Pijper
- Franz Schubert
- Felix Mendelssohn
- Robert Schumann
- Johannes Verhulst
- Niels Gade
- Anton Rubinstein
- Louis Spohr
- Ludwig van Beethoven
- Johannes Brahms
- Joseph Haydn
- Johann Sebastian Bach

== See also ==
- History of Amsterdam
- List of concert halls
- List of tourist attractions in Amsterdam
