= Losser =

- Town and municipality
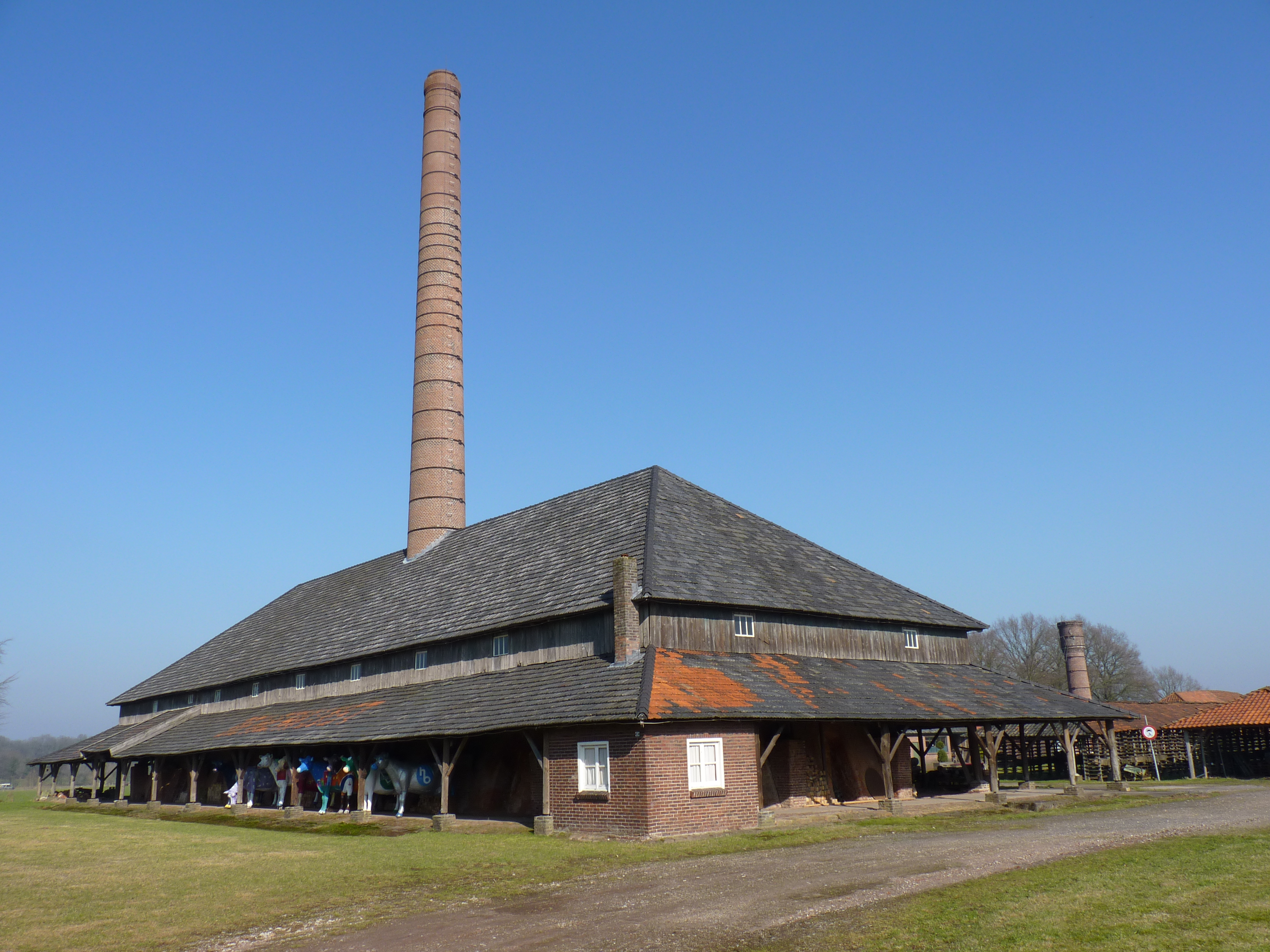
- Monumental former factory in Losser

- Flag Coat of arms

- Location in Overijssel
- Coordinates: 52°16′N 7°0′E
- Country: Netherlands
- Province: Overijssel

Government
  - Body: Municipal council
  - Mayor: Jeroen Diepemaat (VVD)

Area
  - Total: 99.62 km^{2} (38.46 sq mi)
  - Land: 98.76 km^{2} (38.13 sq mi)
  - Water: 0.86 km^{2} (0.33 sq mi)
- Elevation: 35 m (115 ft)

Population (January 2021)
  - Total: 22,888
  - Density: 232/km^{2} (600/sq mi)
- Demonym(s): Lossernaar, Lossenaar
- Time zone: UTC+1 (CET)
  - Summer (DST): UTC+2 (CEST)
- Postcode: 7580–7589
- Area code: 053, 0541
- Website: www.losser.nl

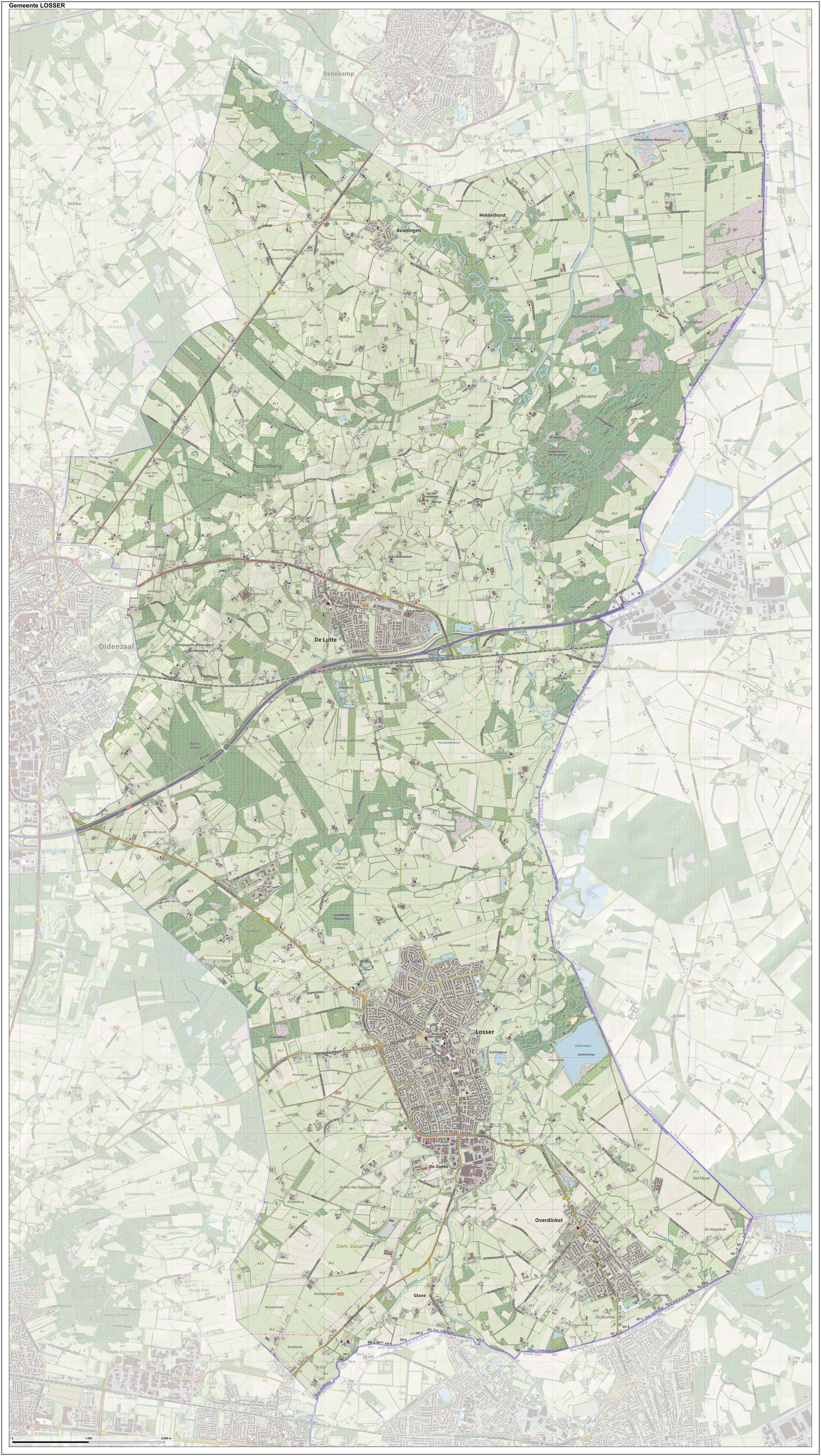
Topographic map of Losser, June 2015

Losser (Dutch pronunciation: [ˈlɔsər]) is a town and municipality in the eastern Netherlands. It is on the German border, at the eastern end of the A1 motorway.

== Population centres ==
- Beuningen
- De Lutte
- Glane
- Losser
- Overdinkel

== Losser ==
The oldest known reference to Losser dates from the tenth century. Originally, the village consisted of two separate parts. Both were almost completely destroyed when on 21 September 1665, troops from Münster set fire to them.

One of the town's oldest buildings is the Martinustoren (St. Martin's Tower), dating from around 1500 and the only remaining part of a church demolished in 1903.

The district of Glane is home to the Mor Ephrem Monastery, the only Syriac Orthodox monastery in Europe. Originally founded in 1911 as the St Olaf monastery by Norwegian Sisters of Saint Joseph of Chambery, it was converted into Syriac Orthodox monastery on 7 July 1984 and is the official diocesan headquarters of the Syriac Orthodox Diocese of the Netherlands.

== Geography ==
A few kilometers west of De Lutte, close to the border with Oldenzaal, lies the Tankenberg, a hill the top of which (85 m) is the highest point in the province. (For myths of the Tankenberg, see Tanfana.)

The municipality's most important body of water is the river Dinkel.

== Sister cities ==
Losser is twinned with:

- Emsbüren, Germany

== Notable people ==
- Pi de Bruijn (born 1942 in Losser) a Dutch architect
- Kim Kötter (born 1982 in Losser) a Dutch director, model and beauty pageant titleholder
- Moniek Nijhuis (born 1988 in Overdinkel) a Dutch swimmer, competed in the 2012 Summer Olympics

== Gallery ==
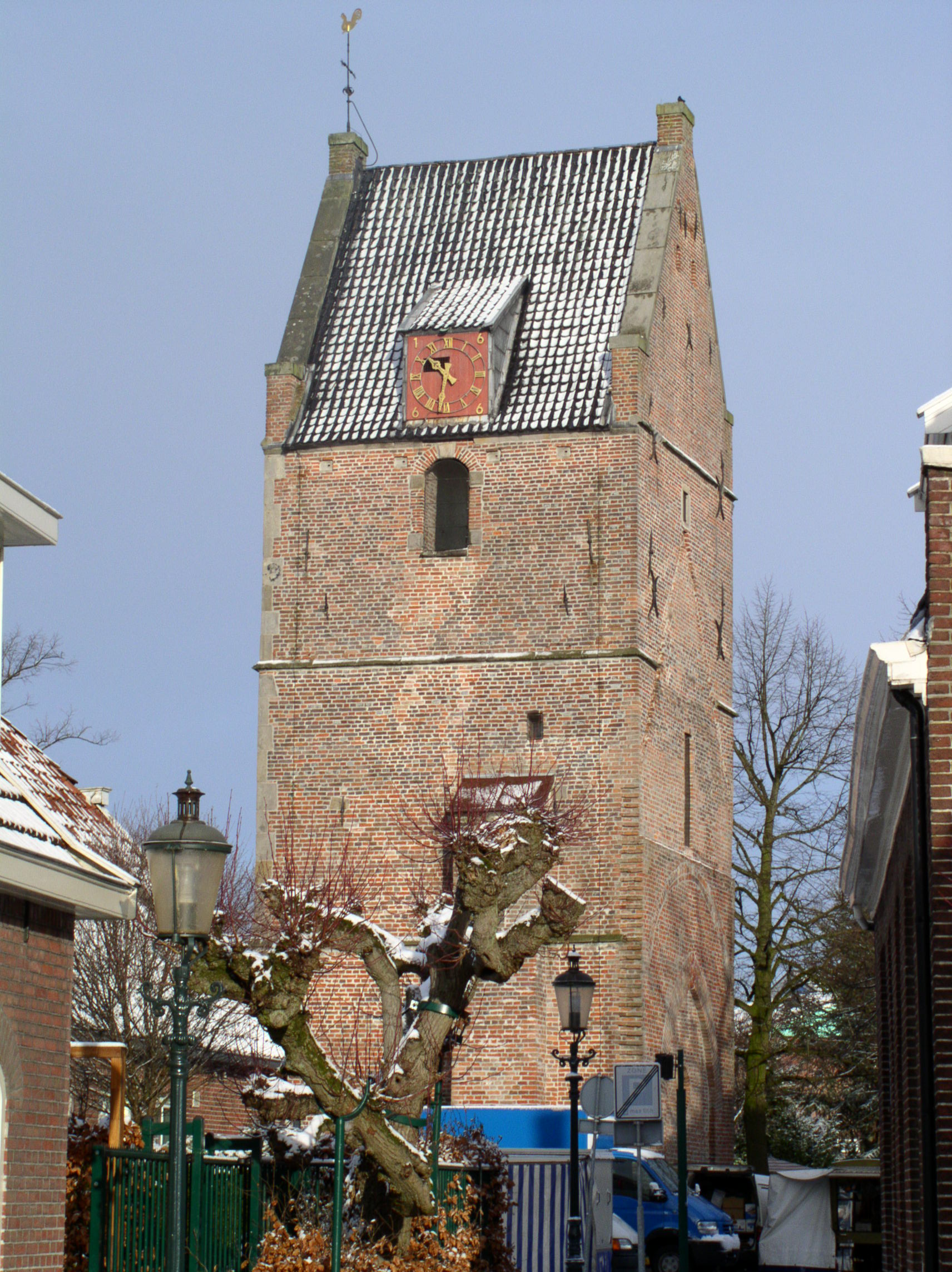
Martin's Tower

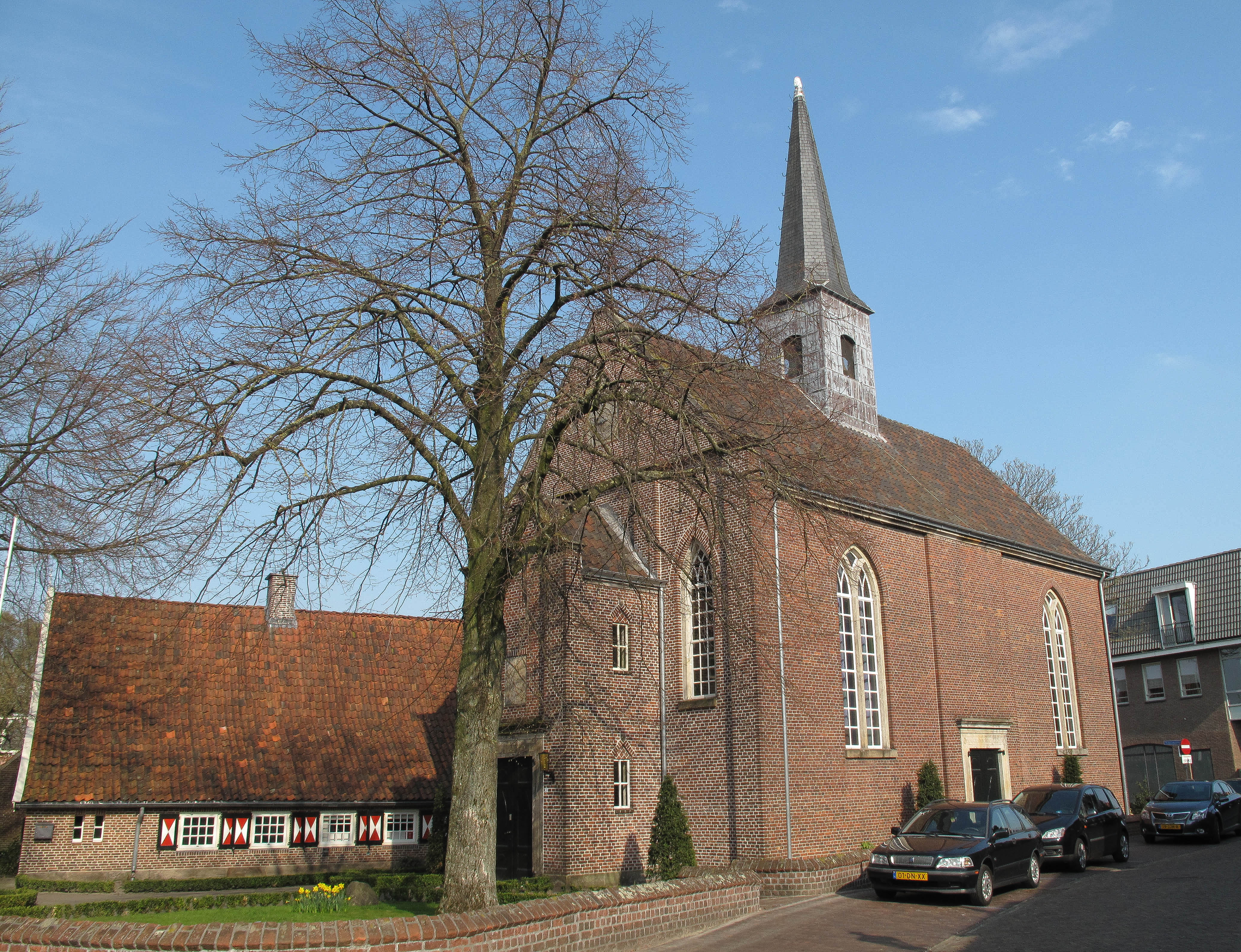
Reformed church

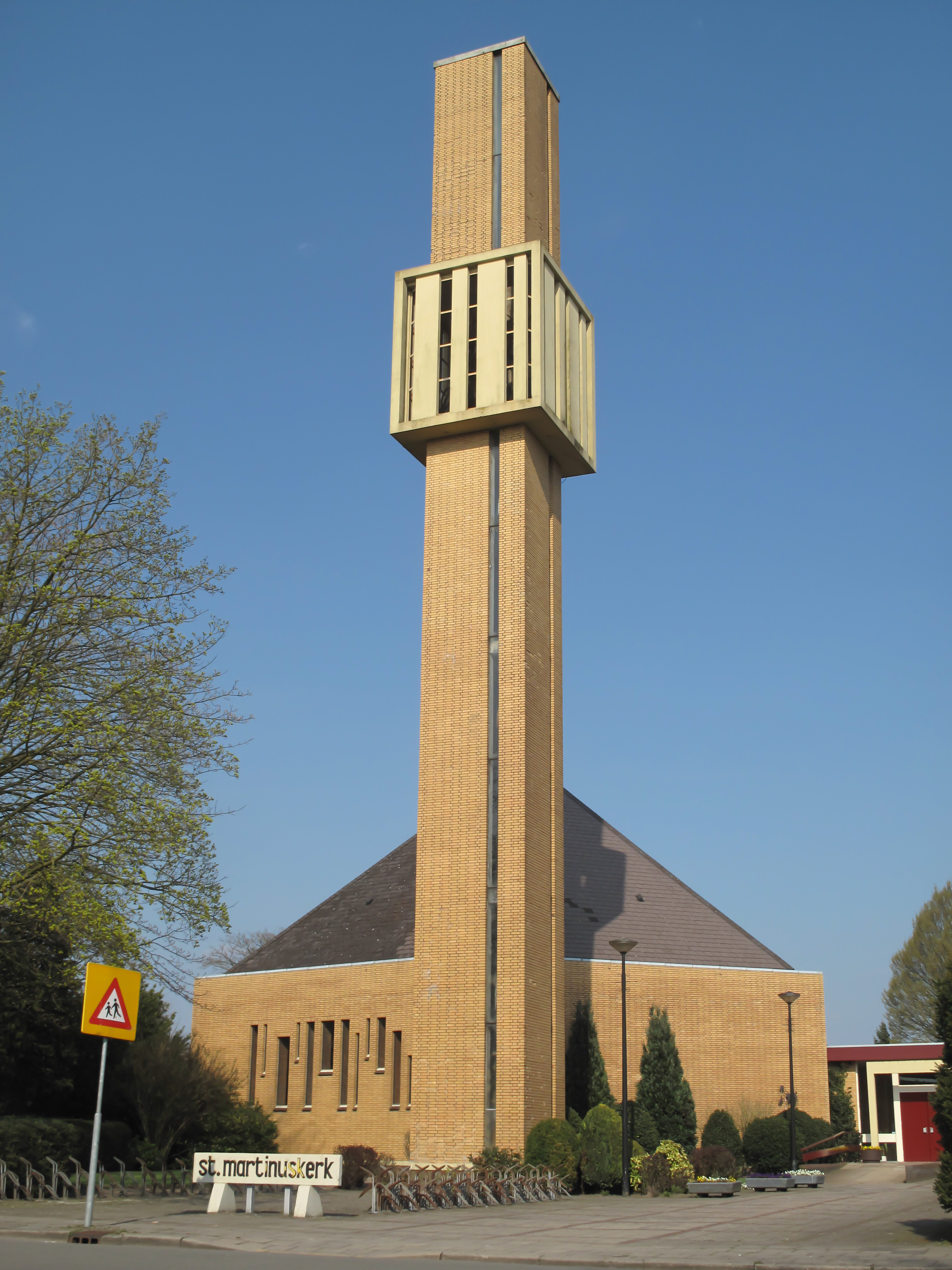
Church: de Sint Martinuskerk

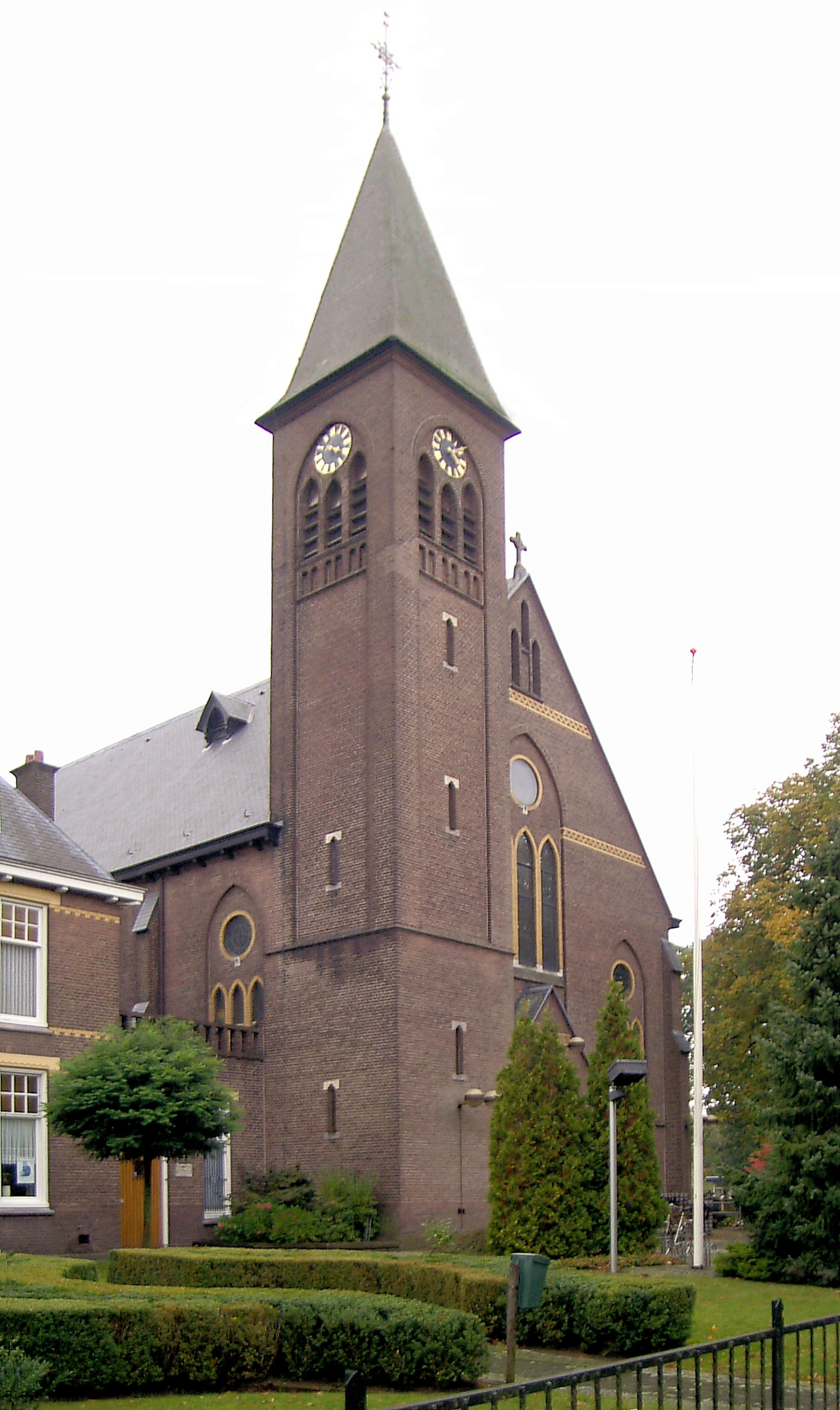
Overdinkel, Rooms katholieke Kerk
