= Landhuishotel Bloemenbeek =

Hotel in Losser, the Netherlands

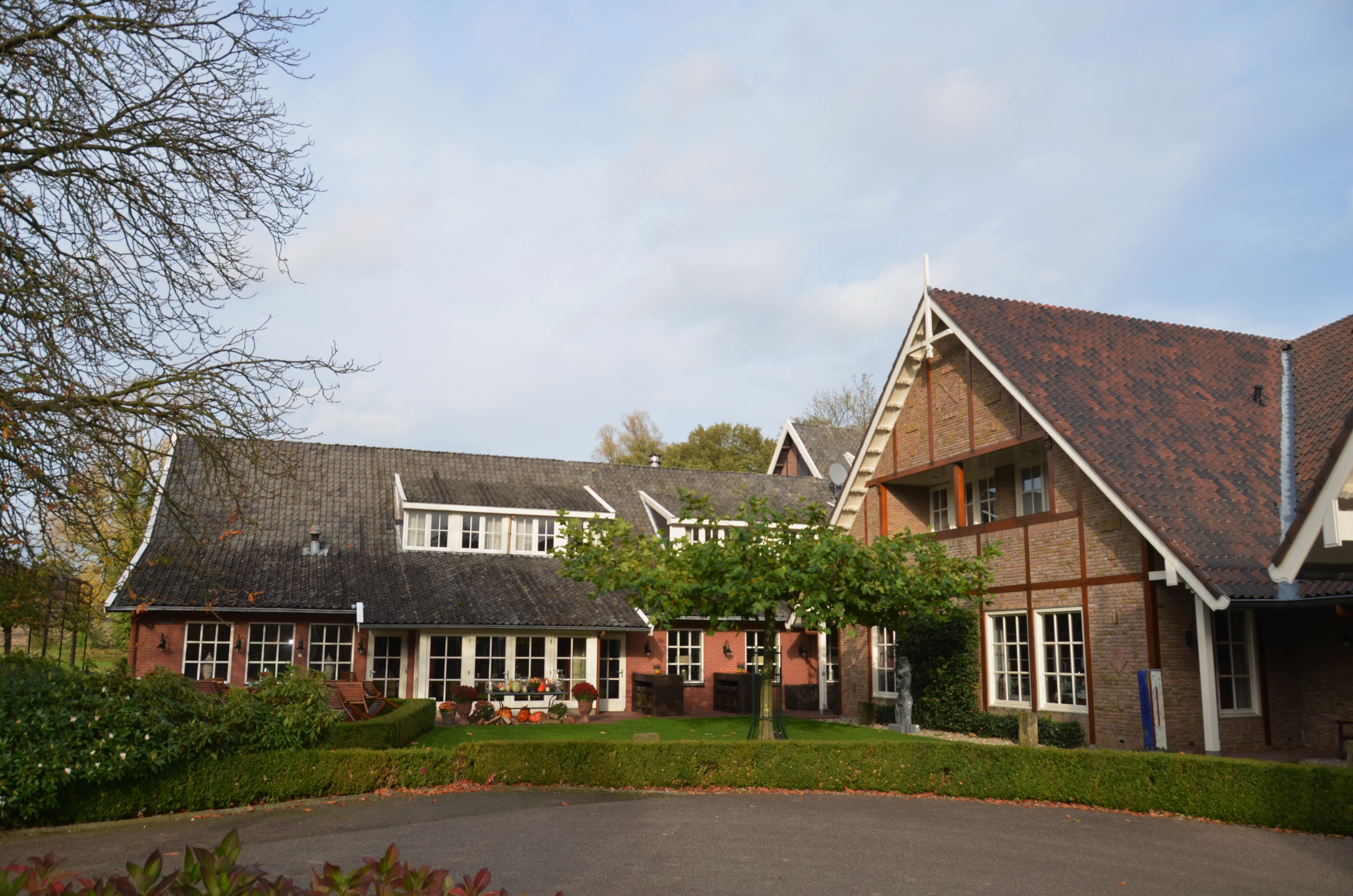
- Restaurant
- Interactive map of the Landhuishotel Bloemenbeek area

General information
- Location: Beuningerstraat 6, De Lutte, Netherlands
- Coordinates: 52°19′12.36″N 6°59′55.68″E
- Opening: 1966

Other information
- Number of rooms: 57
- Number of restaurants: 1

Website
- https://www.bloemenbeek.nl/

Landhuishotel Bloemenbeek is a hotel in De Lutte, Netherlands, set in 2.5-hectare (6.2-acre) grounds. It is noted for its Michelin-starred restaurant De Bloemenbeek which serves French and Mediterranean cuisine, run by Michel van Riswijk as of 2014. The 57-room hotel had its origins when on April 1, 1966, the Strikker family purchased a century old farmhouse which had been a guesthouse and cafe. There is an 18-hole golf course in the vicinity.

== Gallery ==
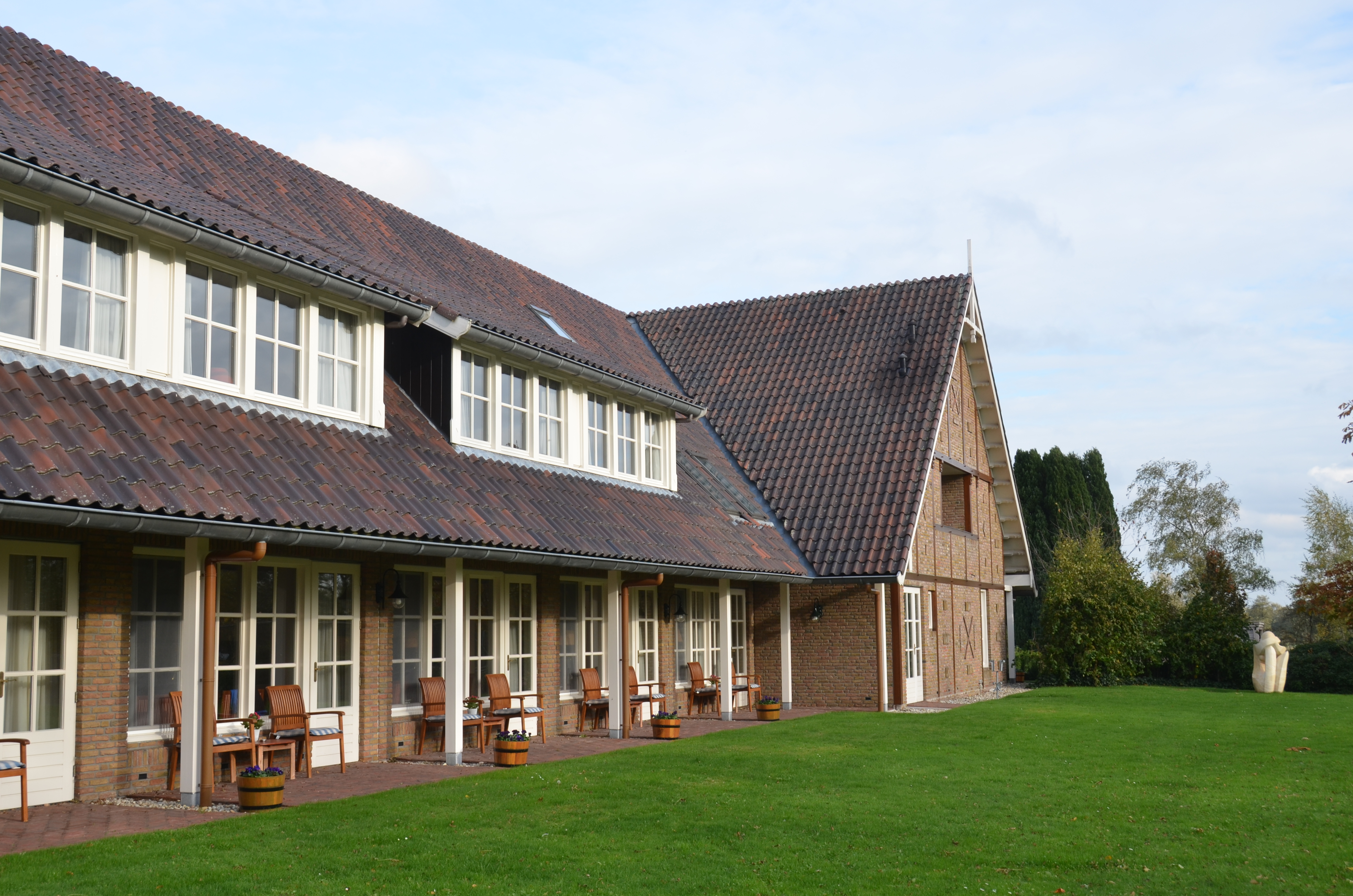
Southview

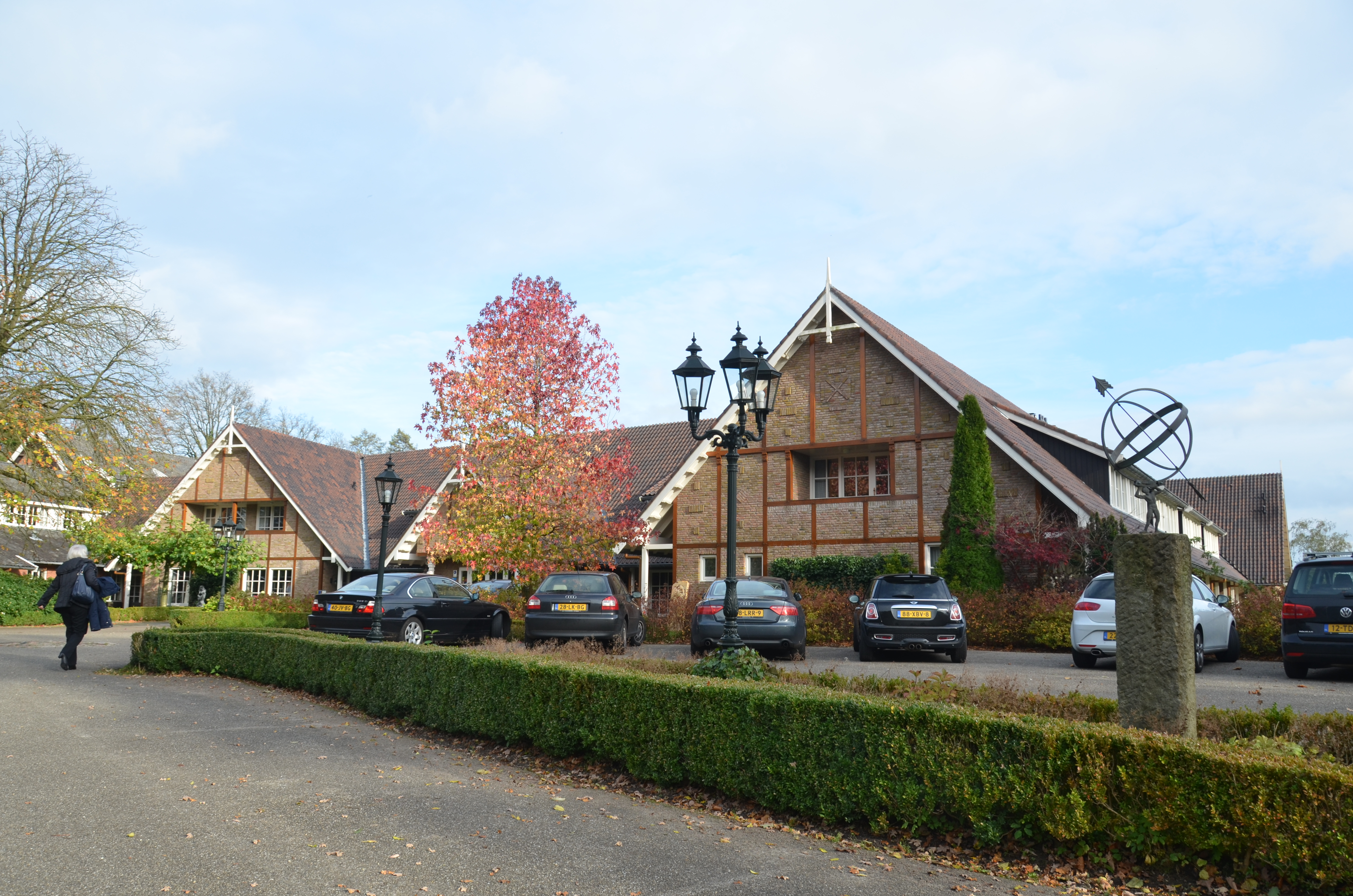
Frontview

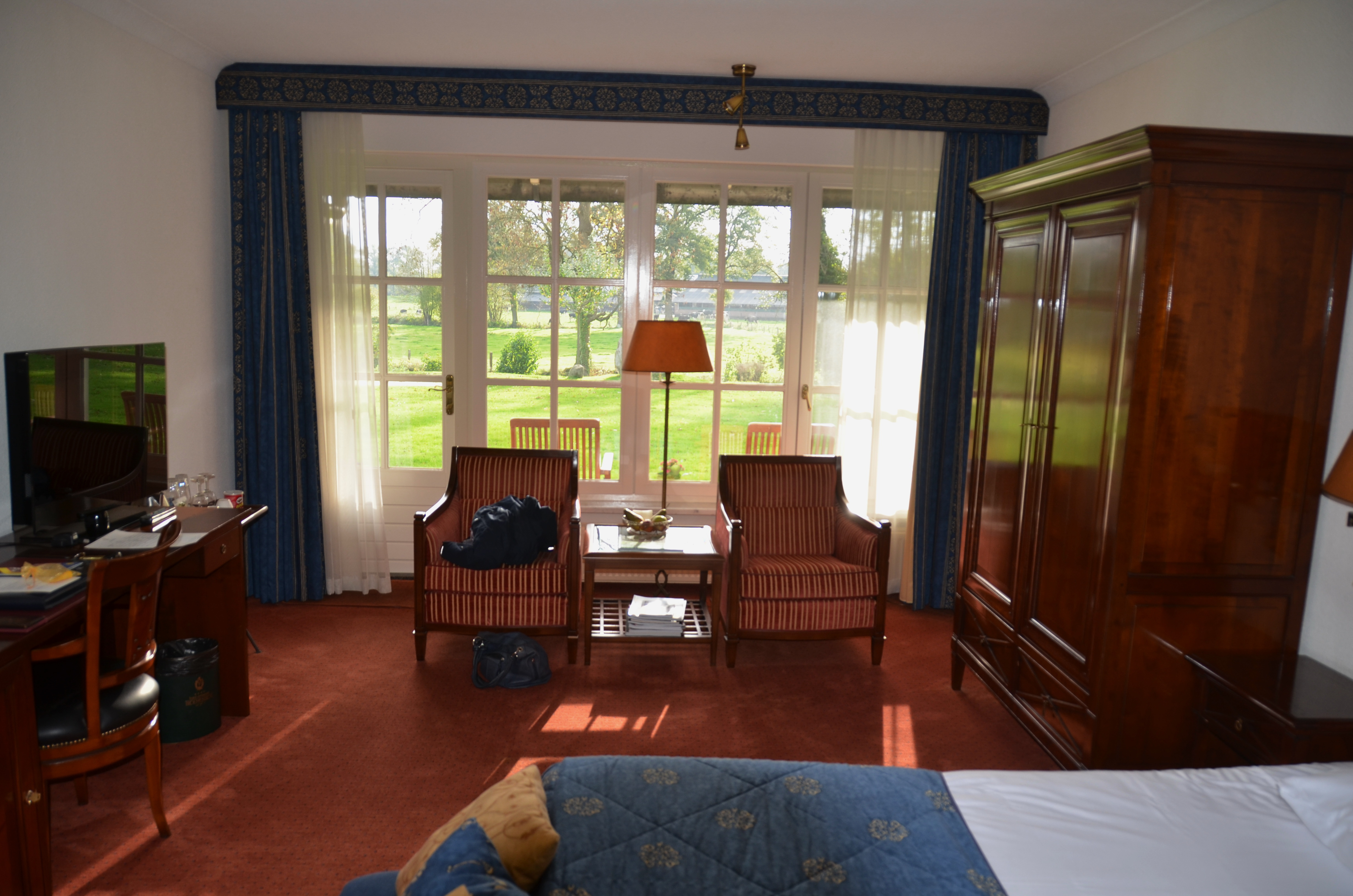
Interior
