= Beuningen, Overijssel =

Beuningen
- Village
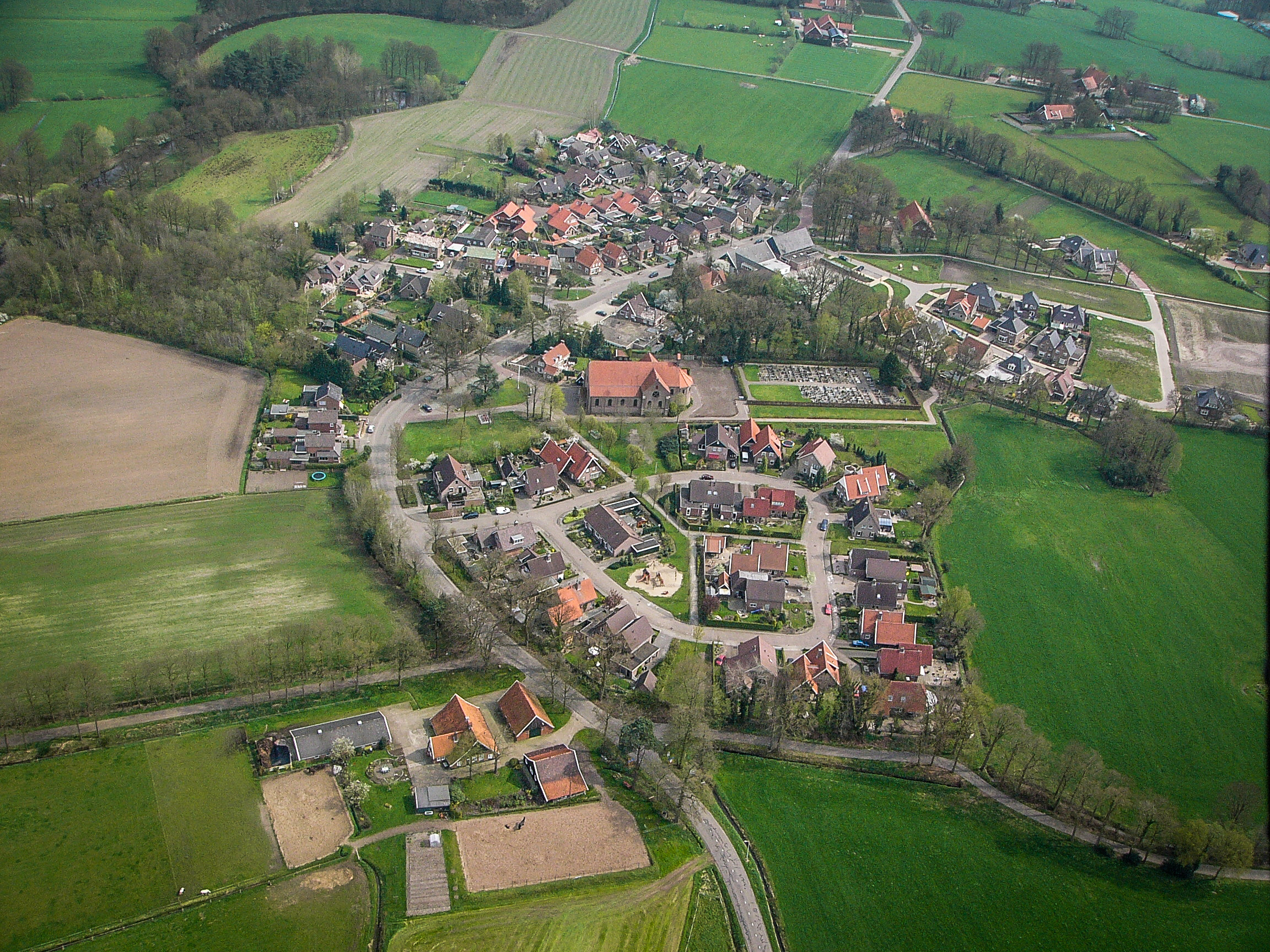
- Aerial view of Beuningen

- Location in the province of Overijssel in the Netherlands Beuningen (Netherlands)
- Coordinates: 52°21′31″N 6°59′56″E
- Country: Netherlands
- Province: Overijssel
- Municipality: Losser

Area
  - Total: 23.12 km^{2} (8.93 sq mi)
- Elevation: 29 m (95 ft)

Population (2021)
  - Total: 970
  - Density: 42/km^{2} (110/sq mi)
- Time zone: UTC+1 (CET)
  - Summer (DST): UTC+2 (CEST)
- Postal code: 7588
- Dialing code: 0541

Beuningen (Dutch pronunciation: [ˈbøːnɪŋə(n)]) is a village in the eastern Netherlands. It is located in the municipality of Losser, Overijssel and situated along the river Dinkel, in a mainly rural area, approximately one kilometre south of Denekamp.

== History ==
The village was first mentioned in the late-10th century as "in Baningi", and means "settlement of the people of Bono (person)". Beuningen started as a collection of farms south of Denekamp. It started to develop after World War II.

The estate Borgbeuningen was built in 1709 on the former site of a medieval castle. The estate is surrounded by a large park whose lanes are aligned with the church towers of the region. In the centre of the forest, there is a rectangular and crucifix-shaped pond.

Beuningen was home to 699 people in 1840. Beuningen used to be part of the parish Denekamp, in 1818 the boermarke (predecessor of municipality) Beuningen became part of the municipality of Losser.

A Roman Catholic church from 1948 is located in the village, and Beuningen was elevated to a village. A campsite, a soccer field and a forest are located just outside the village.

== In popular art ==
Many scenes of the fictional village Dinkelo in the regional soap opera Van Jonge Leu en Oale Groond were shot in Beuningen..

== Gallery ==
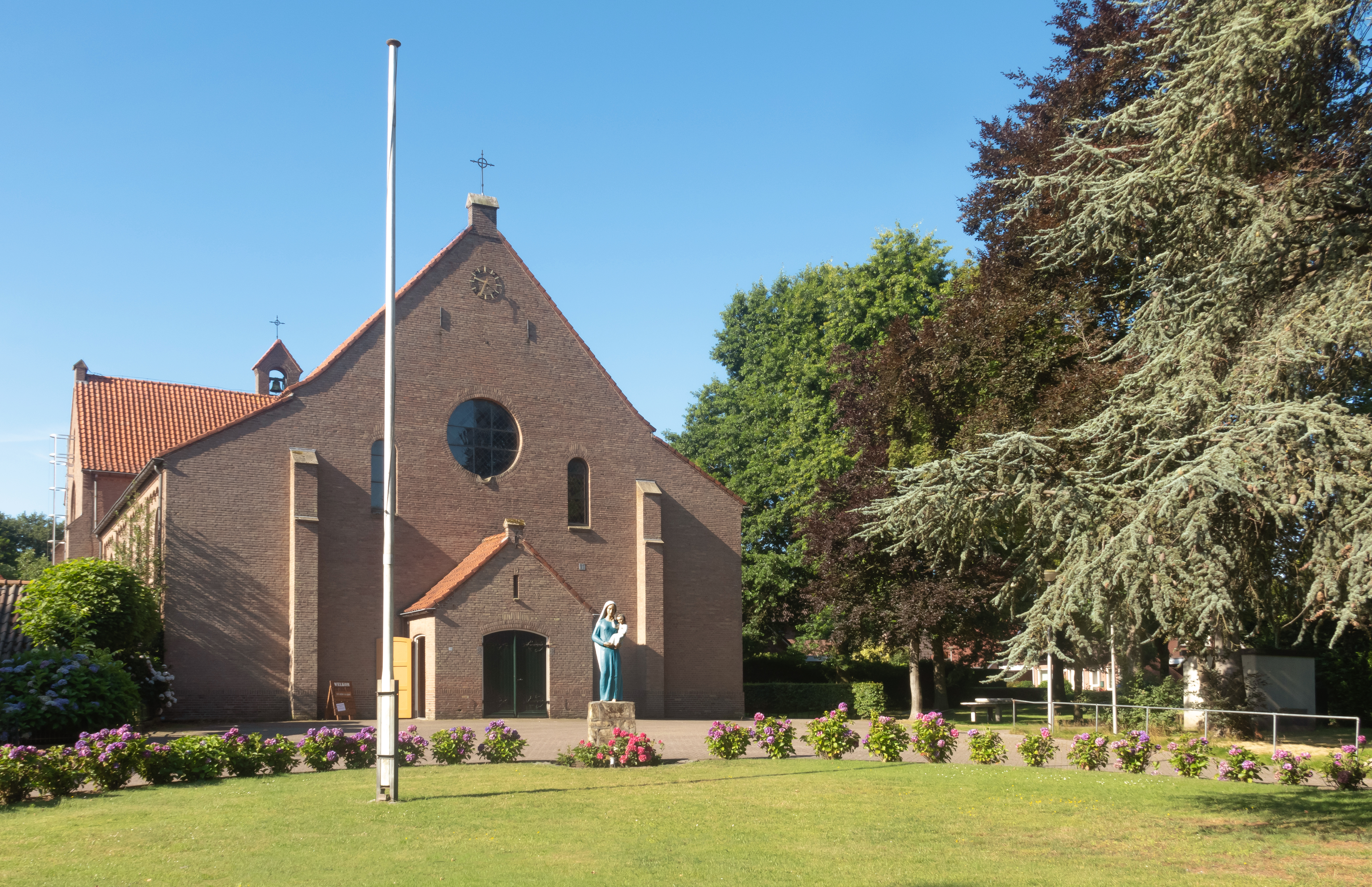
Maria church: Onze Lieve Vrouwekerk

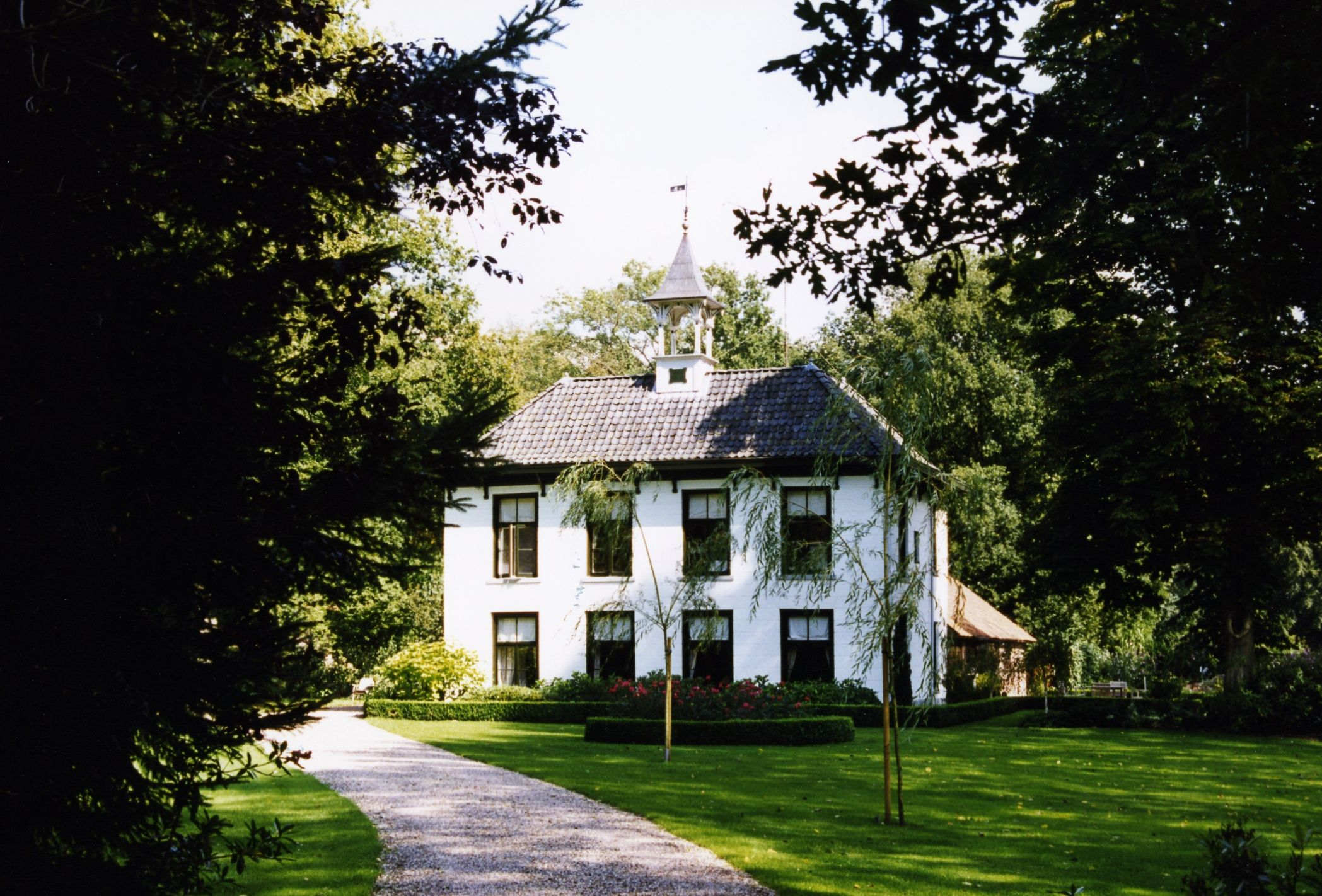
Borgbeuningen

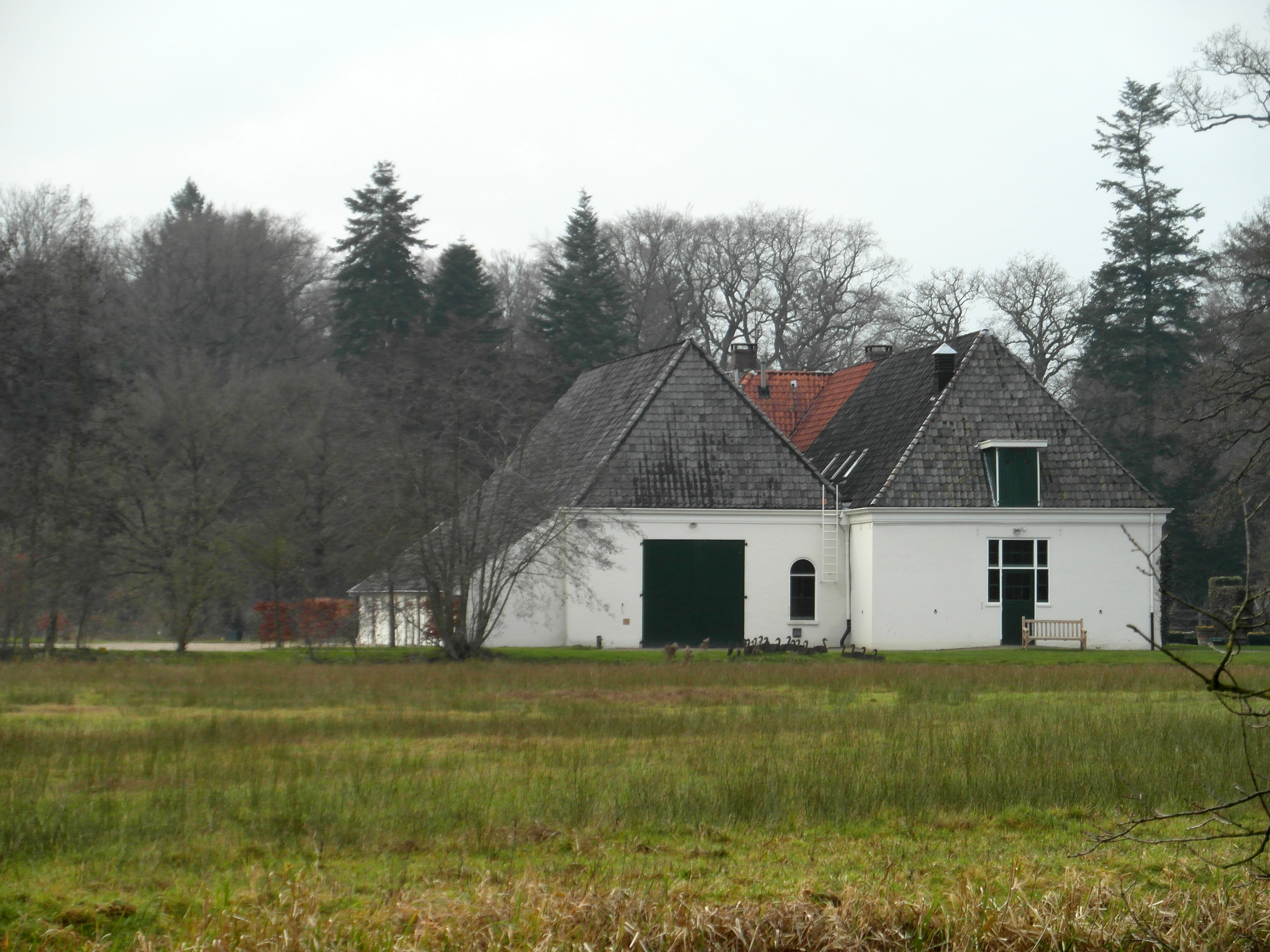
Barns near Singraven
