= De Lutte =

- Village
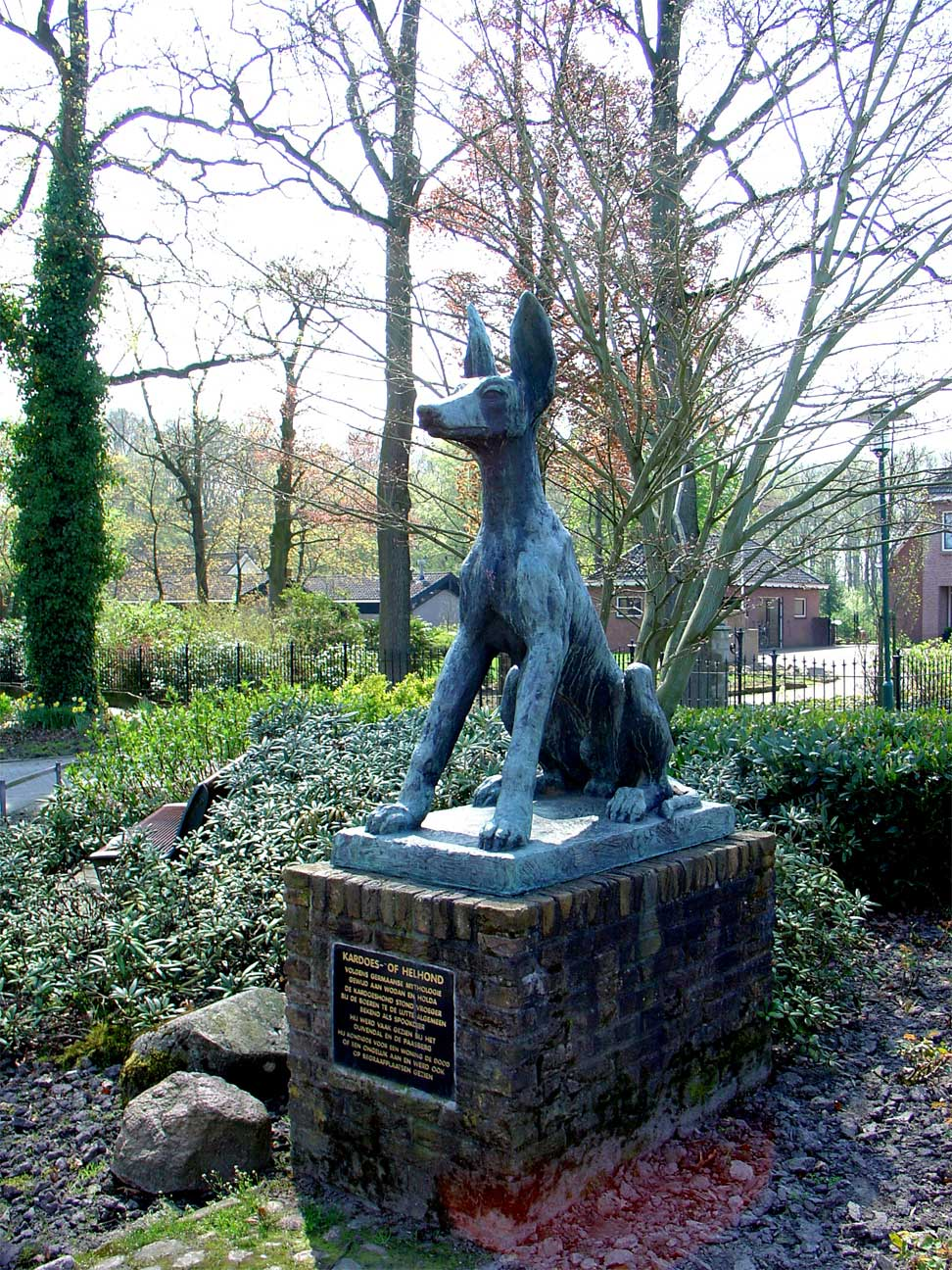
- The Hellhound, symbol of De Lutte

- Location in the province of Overijssel in the Netherlands De Lutte (Netherlands)
- Coordinates: 52°18′46″N 6°59′30″E
- Country: Netherlands
- Province: Overijssel
- Municipality: Losser

Area
  - Total: 41.55 km^{2} (16.04 sq mi)
- Elevation: 49 m (161 ft)

Population (2021)
  - Total: 3,905
  - Density: 93.98/km^{2} (243.4/sq mi)
- Time zone: UTC+1 (CET)
  - Summer (DST): UTC+2 (CEST)
- Postal code: 7587
- Dialing code: 0541

De Lutte is a village in the Dutch province of Overijssel. It is located in the municipality of Losser. It is located close to the border between the Netherlands and Germany. De Lutte is connected to Germany (to the east) and Oldenzaal and Hengelo (to the west) by the A1 motorway.

The Landhuishotel Bloemenbeek with its Michelin-starred restaurant De Bloemenbeek is located in the village.

The Losser (De Lutte) Roman Catholic Churchyard contains the graves of five Second World War soldiers who served with the Royal Air Force. Three of the deceased soldiers served with the United Kingdom while the remaining two served with Australia. The graves are for sergeant Sydney Hennan, sergeant William Leonard Wykes, flight sergeant Conrad George Johnston, sergeant John Fisher Morgan and flight sergeant John Kevin Thompson.

A river closeby is the Dinkel. The rural landscape around the village has some good examples of farms and barns in the style of the Low German house with timber framing and wooden gables.

== Gallery ==
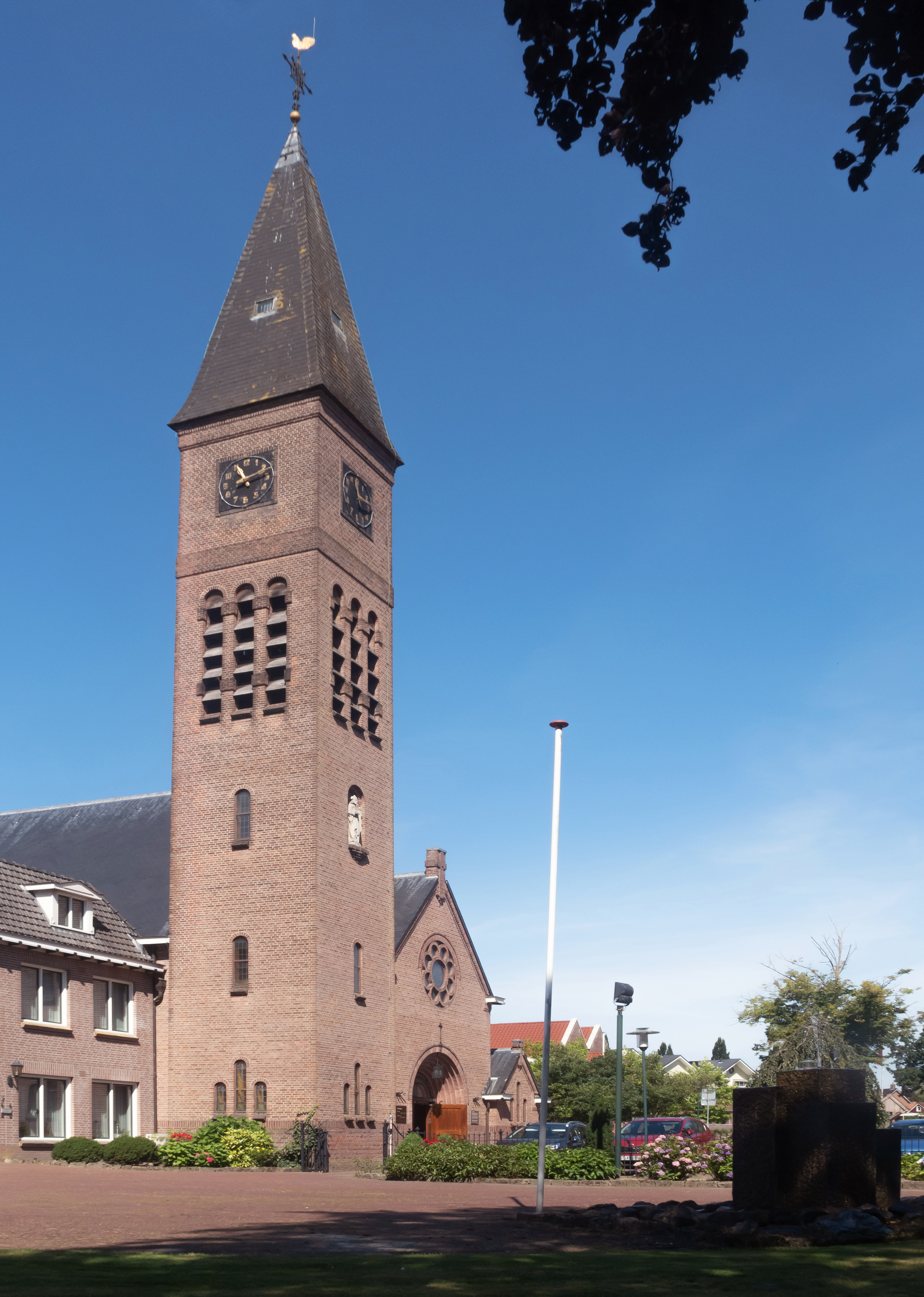
Church: the Plechelmuskerk

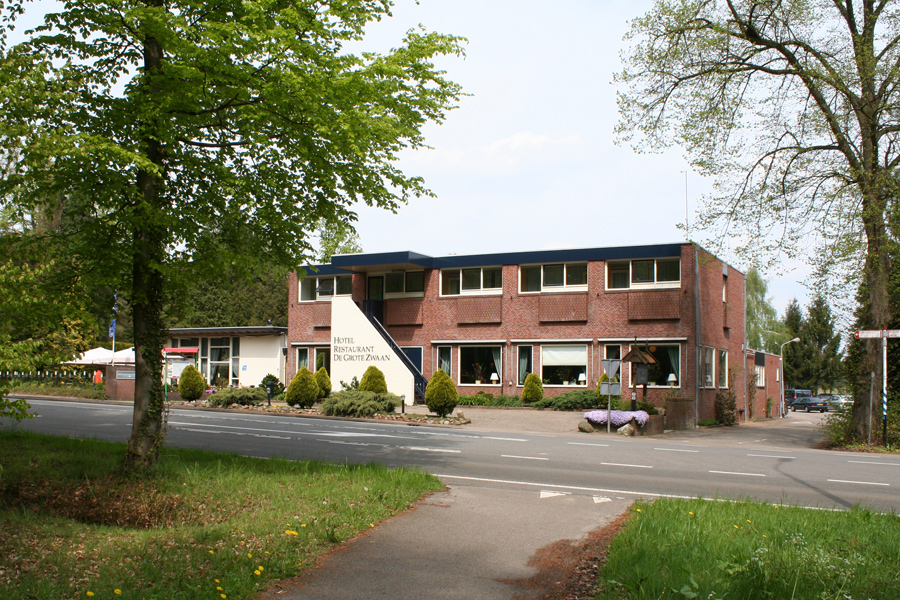
Hotel in De Lutte

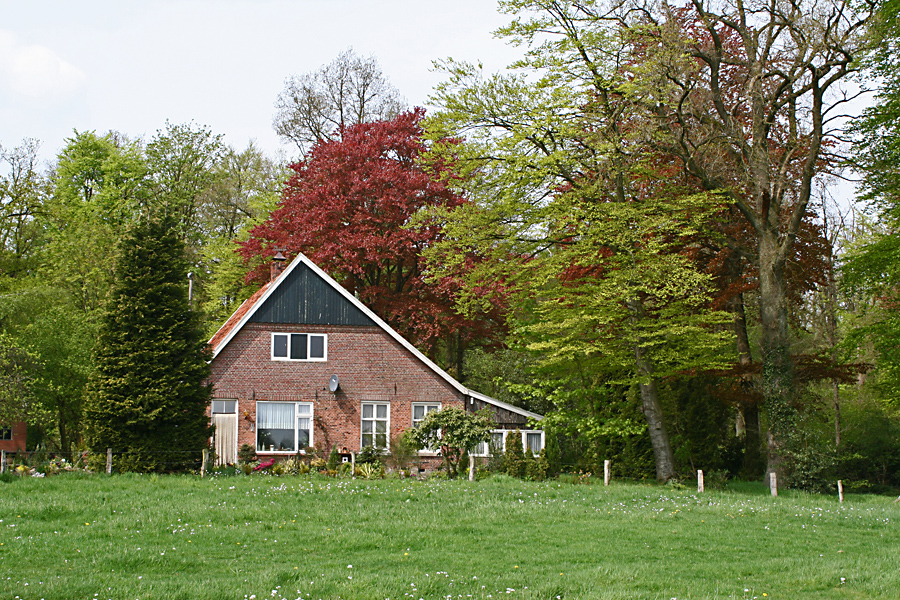
Farm in De Lutte

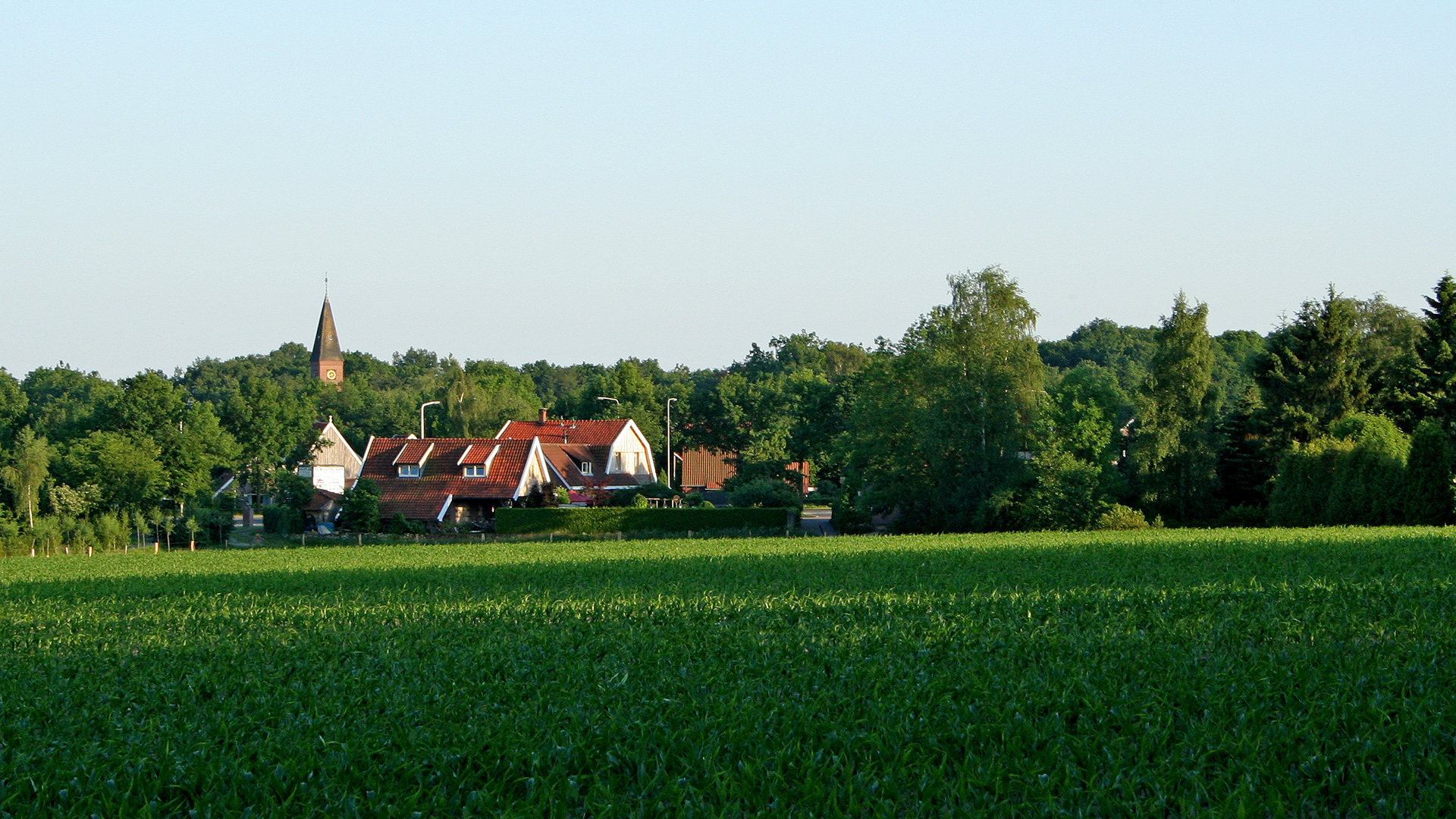
View on De Lutte

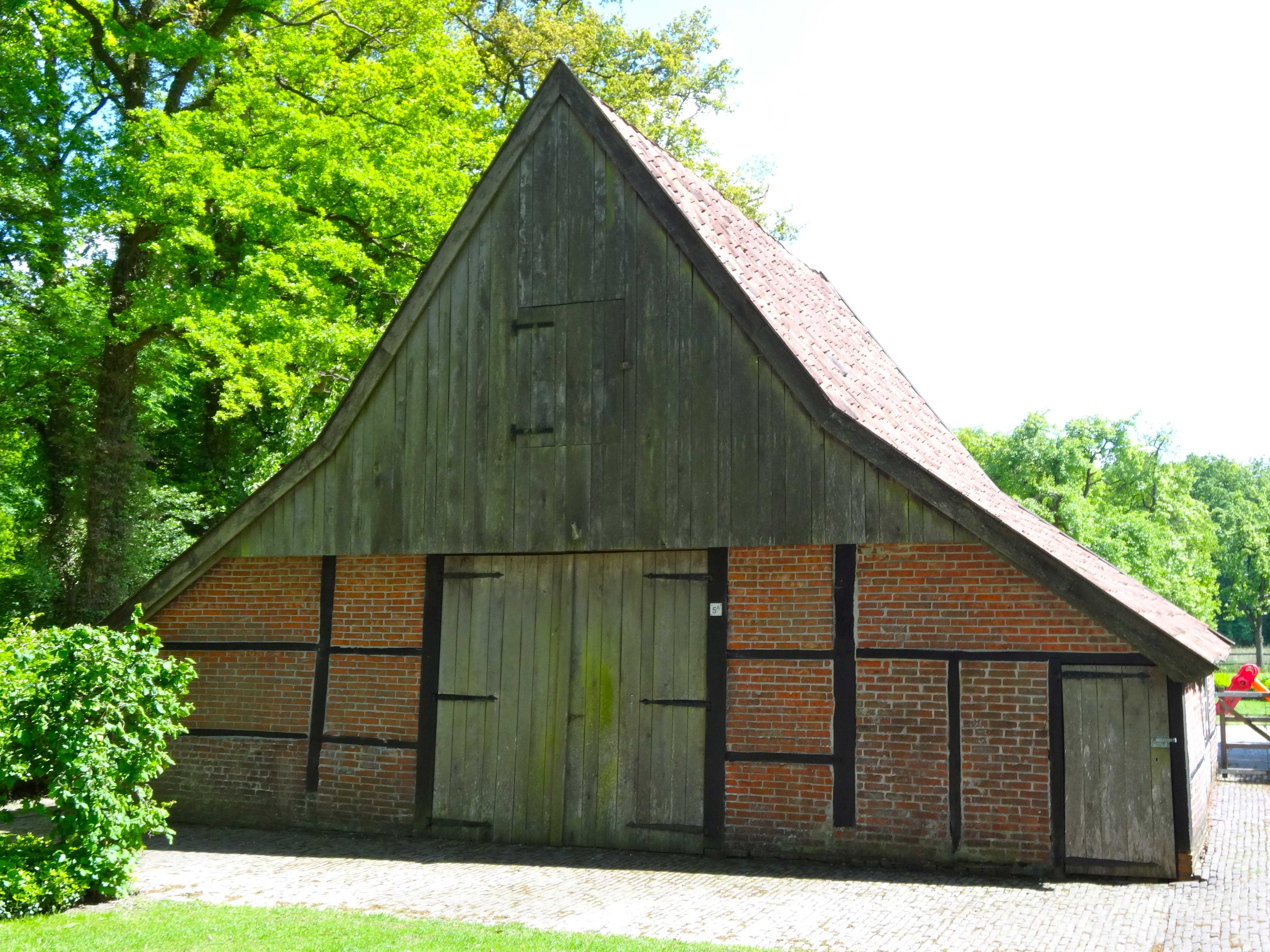
Low German barn
