= Pi de Bruijn =

Dutch architect

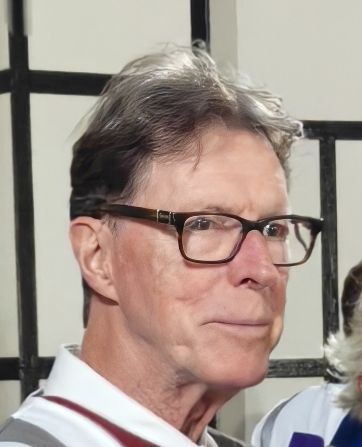
- De Bruijn in 2025
- Born: Paulus Bernard de Bruijn; 28 August 1942 (age 84); Losser, Netherlands
- Education: Technische Universiteit Delft
- Occupations: Architect; Urban planner
- Practice: de Architekten Cie.

Pi de Bruijn (born 28 August 1942) is a Dutch architect from Losser, Overijssel, the Netherlands. He is a design principal at the Office de Architecten Cie., located in Amsterdam.

== History ==
Bruijn graduated from the Delft University of Technology.

He won the second prize, awarded in 1993, in the design competition for the revisioning project of the Reichstag building in newly reunified Berlin.

Bruijn is an officer of the Order of Orange-Nassau.
