= List of Imperial War Graves staff burials =

This is a list of the known graves of the staff from the Imperial War Graves Commission & Commonwealth War Graves Commission who died in service or who were eligible for headstones, from 1917 to 2007.

== Burials in France ==
=== Somme ===
Name	Date of death	Burial location	Additional information	Grave photo
Donald Alexander Campbell	24 April 1939	Cimetière Communal Albert	Appointed as a Carpenter on 1 September 1920, and proceeded to France. Promoted to Clerk of Works on 22 January 1923. Transferred to Gardener's Labourer on 22 October 1930, and then promoted to Gardener on 22 February 1932. Transferred to a Temporary Foreman of Works on 30 October 1933, and then to Travelling Craftsman on 1 April 1935. Previously served in the Royal Field Artillery for 22 years, leaving the military as an Acting Major.	Campbell's grave in Albert Communal Cemetery
Frederick Lumsden	15 February 1935	Cimetière Communal Albert	Appointed as a Travelling Superintendent Gardener on 28 January 1920, and proceeded to France. Promoted to Assistant Horticultural Officer on 1 September 1921, and transferred back to Travelling Superintendent Gardener on 1 April 1923. Had previously served as a Lieutenant in 4th Battalion Royal Sussex Regiment during the Great War. Prior to the Great War, he had been an Agricultural and Horticulteral student.	Lumsden's grave in Albert Communal Cemetery
Arthur J. Taylor	6 April 1925	Cimetière Communal Albert	Died age 41. Previously served for 11 years with the Royal Army Medical Corps.	Arthur's grave in Albert Communal Cemetery
Bernard Ernest Wellum	11 July 1921	Albert Communal Cemetery Extension	Died age 25. During the Great War, he served with the Royal Army Medical Corps. He joined the IWGC 8 June 1921, believed died of illness. His grave is unusual in that it is a standard CWGC war dead headstone, as opposed to the flat-topped stone or post war/civilian type stone.	Bernard's grave in Albert Communal Cemetery Extension
William Arthur Brown	1954	Cimetière Communal Auchonvillers	Originally from Grimsby, William emigrated to Winnipeg in 1914. He began work as head of Beaumont-Hamel British Cemetery until WW2. He returned in 1945 as curator of the Newfoundland Memorial Park until his death in 1954.	William's grave in Auchonvillers
George O. Hill	22 July 1946	Corbie Communal Cemetery Extension	Died age 47. Served with the Royal Welsh Fusiliers and South Wales Borderers during the Great War.	George's grave in Corbie
Frank A. H. Hayward	20 December 1936	Cimetière Communal Courcelette	Former gardener of the Courcelette area cemeteries, who served with the Royal Sussex Regiment in WW1. He joined the IWGC in 1919, first as a gardener in the Godewaersvelde area. In 1935 he moved to Courcelette as a Gardener Labourer until his death in 1936.	Frank Hayward's Grave at Courcelette
James Henry Lester	23 September 1922	Cimetière Communal Étricourt-Manancourt	23 September 1922; Peronne office of the IWGC were informed that one of their employees had become unwell. Three others were sent off to collect the man to bring back to Peronne. James, the driver, on the return to Peronne became disorientated and plummeted into the Canal du Nord. However, all four men were killed instantly. "The funeral took place in a local cemetery at Etricourt of the four members of the British War Graves Commission who lost their lives in the motoring accident on Sunday night. The Director of the War Graves Commission and the Commandant of the British camp at Romville were among the many mourners."	
William George Prior	23 September 1922	Cimetière Communal Étricourt-Manancourt	23 September 1922; Peronne office of the IWGC were informed that one of their employees had become unwell. Three others were sent off to collect the man to bring back to Peronne. The driver, on the return to Peronne became disorientated and plummeted into the Canal du Nord. However, all four men were killed instantly. It is possible it was William, a gardener-caretaker for the IWGC, was the one who fell ill and required assistance.	
Arthur Edward Scott	23 September 1922	Cimetière Communal Étricourt-Manancourt	23 September 1922; Peronne office of the IWGC were informed that one of their employees had become unwell. Three others were sent off to collect the man to bring back to Peronne. The driver, on the return to Peronne became disorientated and plummeted into the Canal du Nord. However, all four men were killed instantly. Arthur was a labourer for the IWGC at the time of his death.	
William Henry White	23 September 1922	Cimetière Communal Étricourt-Manancourt	23 September 1922; Peronne office of the IWGC were informed that one of their employees had become unwell. 3 others were sent off to collect the man to bring back to Peronne. The driver, on the return to Peronne became disorientated and plummeted into the Canal du Nord. All four men were killed instantly. It is believed William was the medic sent to assist the ill gardener.	
Thomas A. Beckwith	9 November 1945	Cimetière Communal Longueval	Died age 49. Custodian of the South African Memorial Delville Wood. Previously served with the South African Infantry for four years.	Thomas A. Beckwith's grave in Longueval
René Muchembled	July 1944	Cimetière Communal Mailly-Maillet	One of the IWGC's French workers, gardener in the Beaumont-Hamel area. During WW2 he helped fellow gardener Ben Leech to hide evading airmen. In July 1944 he was shot by the Germans in his own home after they discovered he had been hiding weapons. He does not have an IWGC headstone.	René's grave in Mailly-Maillet
Davis Thomas Davies	15 March 1955	Cimetière Communal Miraumont	Died age 67. Previously served for 5 years in the Royal Army Service Corps. Appointed as a Driver on 24 September 1919, and proceeded to France. Transferred to Gardener's Labourer on 14 October 1931, and promoted to Gardener on 29 February 1932. Became a Gardener Caretaker on 1 July 1935. Remained in this role until leaving the Commission on 31 March 1953. His headstone is next to his wife, Marie Davies (née Féret) who died in 1964.	Graves of Davis & Marie Davies in Miraumont
Raymond M. Shreeve	25 February 1953	Cimetière Communal Salouël	Joined the IWGC in 1948 as a pupil gardener. Promoted to Gardener's Labourer in 1949. Died age 25.	
Albert William Ward	4 June 1958	Cimetière Communal Vigancourt	Joined the IWGC as a Gardener Labourer in 1920. Promoted to Gardener Caretaker in 1927. Died age 64.	
Edward Jones	17 March 1940	Cimetière Communal Warloy-Baillon	Joined the IWGC as a Gardener's Labourer in March 1920. By 1934, Edward had been promoted to Head Gardener at Warloy-Baillon. Died age 40 due to a car accident. Had previously served in the Royal Welsh Fusiliers & South Lancashire Regiment during World War One.	Edward's grave in Warloy Baillon
Griffiths Jones	24 July 1947	Cimetière Communal Warloy-Baillon	Died age 43.	Griffiths' grave in Warloy Baillon
Frederick William Ambrose	7 January 1962	Bray-sur-Somme Communal Cemetery	Aged 62. Served as Private Ambrose 016837 in the Royal Army Ordnance Corps. In November 1919 he married Juliette Bellanger in Abbeville.	Headstone of Frederick William Ambrose, Bray-sur-Somme Communal Cemetery, France.

=== Pas-de-Calais ===
Name	Date of death	Burial location	Additional information	Grave photo
Sidney Albert "Bert" Witton	18 August 1945	Arras Communal Cemetery	From Canning Town, London; served with the RAF in the First World War; husband of decorated Comet Line guide Rosine Witton. Bert Witton was interned by the Germans at Ilag VIII Tost and Giromagny. He was repatriated to the UK in March 1945 and went directly into hospital, where he died in August 1945. His body was repatriated to Arras to be buried in his wife's family plot.	Thérier-Witton family grave
Percy Eely	22 March 1949	Cimetière Communal Bapaume	Died age 55. Worked as a Gardener Labourer prior to WW1. Served in the Labour Corps for 3 years, joining the IWGC in 1921.	Percy Eely's grave in Bapaume
William Bailey	5 November 1958	Cimetière Communal Bapaume	Died age 58. Previously served in the Royal Field Artillery for four years. Promoted to Head Gardener for Bapaume area in 1952.	William Bailey's grave in Bapaume
Sir Frank Higginson	20 November 1958	Cabaret Rouge British Cemetery	Born 22 April 1890. Served as a Lieutenant in the 14th Battalion Canadian Infantry (Quebec Regiment) during World War One. In November 1918 he was seconded to the IWGC as an architect in France and was formally demobilised as a Captain in July 1919.Later that year, he was taken on as Assistant Inspector of Works for France and then appointed Deputy Director of Works for France. By September 1926, he was appointed Assistant Deputy Inspector of Works before being appointed Deputy Director of Work in 1927. In 1928, he was made an Honorary Lt.-Colonel. Between 1928 and 1938, he served as the Chief Admin Officer for Central Europe for the IWGC.	Memorial plaque to Higginson and his wife
Lieutenant Colonel Gerald Cornock-Taylor CBE	14 February 1919	Fillievres British Cemetery	Died age 34. Deputy Director of Graves Registration and Enquiries and Secretary to the Imperial War Graves Commission from 13 December 1917 until his death in 1919.	Cornock-Taylor's grave in Fillievres
Walter Patchett	23 March 1933	Cimetière Communal Hébuterne	Gardener's Labourer for the IWGC.	Walter's grave in Hébuterne
Reginald George Covey	9 June 1975	Cimetière Communal Hébuterne	Joined the IWGC in 1921 as a Gardener's Labourer. Promoted to Gardener-Caretaker in 1937. Died age 75. Also buried with his wife, Marie Thomas, who died in 1991. Reginald had previously served with the Royal West Kent Regiment during World War One.	Reginald's grave in the Communal Cemetery in Hebuterne
George Evans	November 1937	Longuenesse (St. Omer) Souvenir Cemetery	Died 1937, age 56. Husband of Zoe Caron Evans, a local Resistance operative deported to Germany in 1942.	Evans' grave in Longuenesse Souvenir Cemetery
Joseph Goode	7 May 1920	Longuenesse (St. Omer) Souvenir Cemetery	Joined the IWGC in January 1920 as a Painter/Carpenter. Died age 49 due to accidental drowning. Previously served with the Royal Engineers during World War One.	Goode's grave in St Omer
John Edwin Reynolds	19 October 1920	Longuenesse (St. Omer) Souvenir Cemetery	Gardener-caretaker. Died age 44. Previously served with the R.A.M.C. from 1914 to 1919.	Reynolds' grave in St Omer
William Grahame Chambers	11 December 1920	Longuenesse (St. Omer) Souvenir Cemetery	Died age 49. Assistant Transport Officer for the IWGC. Previously served as a Major in the Royal Air Force.	Chambers' grave in St Omer
Harry Havelock Lawrence	9 February 1921	Longuenesse (St. Omer) Souvenir Cemetery	Gardener-caretaker. Died age 37. Previously served in the Royal Fusiliers and the Northumberland Fusiliers.	
A. W. Hine	5 April 1921	Longuenesse (St. Omer) Souvenir Cemetery	Employed as a Fitter & Turner from October 1920. Died age 44, from accidental injuries. Served during the First World War as a Sergeant in the Royal Army Service Corps.	Hine's grave in St Omer
Alfred Symonds	11 June 1921	Longuenesse (St. Omer) Souvenir Cemetery	Catering staff for the IWGC.	Symonds' grave in St Omer
Horace Bernard Adams	10 June 1923	Longuenesse (St. Omer) Souvenir Cemetery	Died age 31. Joined the IWGC in September 1922 as Clerk of Works in France.	Adams' grave in St Omer
Lionel Aubrey Tompkins	23 March 1924	Longuenesse (St. Omer) Souvenir Cemetery	Died age 57. Joined the IWGC as a cook in September 1919. Transferred to Messenger in December 1920. Previously worked in a hospital during World War One.	Tompkins' grave in St Omer
Lieutenant Léon Henri Paul Dematons	26 April 1924	Longuenesse (St. Omer) Souvenir Cemetery	Born in Paris on 20 October 1877. Imperial War Graves Liaison Officer, 1919–1924. Served in the military for 22 years, including spending his war service in the Corps des Interprètes. Died age 43.	Lieutenant Dematon's grave in St Omer
James Horan	6 September 1924	Longuenesse (St. Omer) Souvenir Cemetery	Employed as a Gardener's Labourer in June 1920. Died age 25.	Horan's grave in St Omer
John Slacke	11 December 1924	Longuenesse (St. Omer) Souvenir Cemetery	Employed as Gardener's Labourer in September 1920 and promoted to Gardener October 1921. Died age 47.	Slacke's grave in St Omer
Edward Charles Chester	31 January 1926	Longuenesse (St. Omer) Souvenir Cemetery	Died age 37. First employed by the IWGC as Pioneer Class I (Painter/Carpenter) and later worked as a vulcaniser for the Motor Transport section. War service spent in the Royal Army Service Corps (Mechanical Transport).	Edward's grave in St Omer
William Clare	3 February 1926	Longuenesse (St. Omer) Souvenir Cemetery	Began work as a Blacksmith for the IWGC in December 1920. Later promoted to General Duties in October 1920. Died age 56. Served during World War One as a private in the 677th Exhumation Company.	Clare's grave in St Omer
Richard Dinsdale	3 February 1926	Longuenesse (St. Omer) Souvenir Cemetery	Died age 42. Joined the IWGC in April 1920 as a General Labourer, later being promoted to Gardener by November 1922. Served as an Air Mechanic in the Royal Air Force during World War One.	Dinsdale's grave in St Omer
John Marshall Stevenson	19 April 1927	Longuenesse (St. Omer) Souvenir Cemetery	Employed as a blacksmith. Died age 39.	Stevenson's grave in St Omer
William George Mudge	17 November 1927	Longuenesse (St. Omer) Souvenir Cemetery	Employed by the IWGC in July 1921 as a Gardener's Labourer. Died age 36. Previously served with the Royal Fusiliers (City of London Regiment).	William's grave in St Omer
George Edward Wright	21 February 1928	Longuenesse (St. Omer) Souvenir Cemetery	Employed as Travelling Craftsman & Letter Cutter by the IWGC in 1925. Previously served with the Royal Garrison Artillery.	Wright's grave in St Omer
Gilbert Strange Elliot	15 June 1928	Longuenesse (St. Omer) Souvenir Cemetery	Assistant Land & Legal Adviser. Died age 58.	Gilbert's grave in St Omer
Joseph J. Loosemore	28 February 1934	Longuenesse (St. Omer) Souvenir Cemetery	Senior mechanic. Left the IWGC in 1921. Died age 50.	Joseph's grave in St Omer
George Evans	25 November 1937	Longuenesse (St. Omer) Souvenir Cemetery	Superintendent Clerk for the IWGC. Died age 56.	George's grave in St Omer
Edgar Frederick Harper	10 September 1938	Longuenesse (St. Omer) Souvenir Cemetery	Joined the IWGC in May 1919 as Mechanic Workshop Foreman. Later promoted to Transport Superintendent in January 1938. Died age 42.	Harper's grave in St Omer
John Christopher Fields	24 March 1939	Longuenesse (St. Omer) Souvenir Cemetery	Appointed as Fitter's Mate in September 1924 working in Belgium & France. Died age 54. War service spent in the Royal Army Service Corps.	Fields' grave in St Omer
George William Winter L.R.I.B.A.	6 August 1950	Longuenesse (St. Omer) Souvenir Cemetery	Born 3 June 1888. Served as a Lieutenant in the Royal Engineers during the First World War. Joined the IWGC as a Draughtsman in 1921; first working in Macedonia. He then transferred to France in 1924 as a Quantity Surveyor. Later promoted to Senior Superintendent of Works in 1947.	Winter's grave in St Omer
Herbert S. Dickens	6 June 1953	Longuenesse (St. Omer) Souvenir Cemetery	Appointed as a Carter in July 1919 in France. Later worked as General Labourer, Fitter's Mate & Blacksmith/Coppersmith before finally transferring to Gardener in 1952. Died age 55. Served in the Royal Army Service Corps during World War One.	Dickens' grave in St Omer
Thomas Daniel Luscombe	15 July 1956	Longuenesse (St. Omer) Souvenir Cemetery	Appointed as Gardener-caretaker in April 1954. Later promoted to Head Gardener in November 1954. Died age 41.	Luscombe's grave in St Omer
William Clark	29 August 1961	Longuenesse (St. Omer) Souvenir Cemetery	Died age 63.	Clark's grave in St Omer
Francis William Vass B.E.M.	25 March 1966	Longuenesse (St. Omer) Souvenir Cemetery	First employed by the IWGC in 1920 as Gardener's Labourer. Promoted to Gardener Caretaker in 1927 and later to Head Gardener in 1947. Retired from the CWGC in 1961. Died age 70.	Vass' grave in St Omer
A. C. Nunn	20 September 1973	Longuenesse (St. Omer) Souvenir Cemetery	Died age 53.	Nunn's grave in St Omer
George A. D. Cargill	24 September 1974	Longuenesse (St. Omer) Souvenir Cemetery	Died age 61.	Cargill's grave in St Omer
E. A. Pinnock	2 June 1975	Longuenesse (St. Omer) Souvenir Cemetery	Died age 89.	Pinnock's grave in St Omer
A. Brady	11 October 1982	Longuenesse (St. Omer) Souvenir Cemetery	Died age 76.	Brady's grave in St Omer
A. J. Golder	14 October 1983	Longuenesse (St. Omer) Souvenir Cemetery	Died age 57.	Golder's grave in St Omer
Sidney Thomas Groves	26 January 1920	Longuenesse (St. Omer) Souvenir Cemetery	Terlincthun British Cemetery	Appointed as Gardener in May 1919. Served with the King's Royal Rifle Corps during World War One.
John William Preston	8 January 1969	Cimetière Communal Ste Catherine	Appointed as Shorthand Typist in April 1921. Promoted to Storeman in June 1921 and then to Horticultural Clerk in 1928. Became Senior Clerk in April 1946. Retired in January 1956. Died age 78. Also buried with his wife, Laure.	
Frederick Charles Leach	21 September 1961	Cimetière Communal Vimy	First employed by the IWGC in July 1930 as Gardener's Labourer. Became Head Gardener in 1947 and retired in 1953. Died age 66.	
Samuel Pickard	2 November 1920	Cimetière Communal Wimereux	Appointed Travelling Superintendent Gardener for the IWGC in April 1919. Previously retired from military service as a captain in the Manchester Regiment. Died age 59.	Pickard's grave in Wimereux Cemetery
Thomas Trench	9 December 1922	Cimetière Communal Wimereux	Appointed as Gardener for the IWGC in April 1922. Died 9 December 1922, age 54.	Trench's Grave in Wimereux Cemetery

=== Nord ===
Name	Date of death	Burial location	Additional information	Grave photo
C. E. Thomas	15 July 1940	Le Bizet Cemetery, Armentieres	Former IWGC staff.	
Charles M. Baker	22 October 1941	Merville Communal Cemetery Extension	Charles M. Baker was the head gardener of the Merville Group of IWGC Cemeteries. After being arrested in 1940, he died in the hospital at Stalag VIII C in Sagan-Silesia, on 22 October 1941.	Baker in Merville Cemetery
Francis R. G. Grady	2 October 1949	Cimetière Communal Pont-de-Nieppe	Appointed Pupil Gardener in December 1946. Killed in a road accident age 20.	Grave of Francis Grady.
Robert Armstrong	18 December 1944	Valenciennes Communal Cemetery Extension (St. Roch), Valenciennes	Robert Armstrong was the head gardener in Valenciennes. In May 1940, he requested permission to withdraw the two gardeners under his supervision from Valenciennes, but was sent back to work by the IWGC. An Irish citizen, Armstrong was not interned. He joined the Resistance and served in many different capacities. In November 1943, he was arrested by the Germans. After a sentence of death was commuted to eight years with hard labor, Armstrong was sent to various prisons in Germany. He died of exhaustion and beatings in December 1944. Armstrong's body was cremated with the bodies of other prisoners. The citizens of Valenciennes raised funds to place a memorial plaque in St. Roch, the cemetery he tended.	Armstrong's plaque in Valenciennes

=== Aisne ===
Name	Date of death	Burial location	Additional information	Grave photo
Leopold George Shreeve	19 May 1940	Cimetière Communal Vailly-sur-Aisne	Born in London in 1886. George enlisted in the Royal Fusiliers, serving until October 1919. In May 1920 he joined the IWGC as a gardener labourer, becoming a gardener caretaker in 1928. The following was written using information from George's friend W.G. Price: "On May 19, 56-year-old gardener Leopold Shreeve of Vendresse-Beaulne was riding in a car driven by his friend, gardener W.G. Price, when they encountered a German roadblock near Corbeny. At the sight of German tanks, Price turned the car around, but five soldiers opened fire, striking Shreeve in the stomach. "I think I'm hit," Shreeve told Price. He bled to death on the way to a French military hospital."	Leopold's grave in Vailly sur Aisne

== Burials in Belgium ==
=== Flanders ===
Name	Date of death	Burial location	Additional information	Grave photo
Thomas McGrath	23 April 1920	Ljissenthoek Military Cemetery	Appointed Gardener's Labourer for the IWGC in December 1919. Died age 31 from sickness. Formerly served with the 2nd Bn. East Lancashire Regiment & Chinese Labour Corps.	McGrath's grave in Ljissenthoek
W. Aves	5 May 1928	Poperinge Communal Cemetery	Died age 54. Joined the IWGC in 1922 as a Gardener Labourer. Previously served in the Labour Corps during the First World War.	
William Fruish	17 December 1925	Poperinge Communal Cemetery	Died age 38. Joined the IWGC in July 1921.	
Major Arthur James Knowles	12 December 1921	Poperinge Communal Cemetery	Died age 59. Previously served with the 16th Bn. London Regiment (Queen's Westminster Rifles).	
William Thomas Roblou	10 December 1922	Poperinge Communal Cemetery	Died age 41. Appointed as a Driver for the IWGC in Belgium on 7 May 1919. Served as a Sergeant in the Royal Army Service Corps (Motor Transport) during the First World War. His brother, Thomas Hugh Roblou, also worked for the IWGC.	
James Whateley Traill	15 September 1922	Poperinge Communal Cemetery	Born approx. 1875. Appointed as Gardener's Labourer in August 1921. Died age 47.	
Harold Wardale	22 September 1938	Poperinge Communal Cemetery	Began working for the IWGC sometime in the early/mid 1920s as a Gardener Caretaker. Died age 52.	
Harold Owen Frederick Wheaton	11 July 1951	Poperinge Communal Cemetery	Died age 58. Joined the IWGC as a Motor Driver in 1922. Reappointed Gardener Labourer in 1936. Serviced in the Motor Transport of the Royal Army Service Corps during the First World War.	
Michael Stennett	13 September 2000	Voormezele Churchyard	Died age 56. Michael's uncle, Charles Stennett, was killed during the 3rd Battle of Ypres. Michael moved to Belgium to work for the CWGC maintaining cemeteries around Ypres, including Tyne Cot.	Stennett's grave in Voormezele
John Herbert Adamson	18 August 1981	Ypres Town Cemetery	Died age 92. Appointed as a Gardener's Labourer on 12 July 1921, and worked in France. Later promoted to Gardener, and then to Gardener Caretaker. Left the Commission on 15 May 1954. Also buried with his wife, Celine D'Hondt.	
Sidney Arnold	6 February 1995	Ypres Town Cemetery	Died age 79.	
Ernest Edward Bennett	19 May 1978	Ypres Town Cemetery Extension	Appointed as Gardener's Labourer in September 1923. Promoted to Gardener Caretaker in 1927, then to Head Gardener in 1947. Retired from the CWGC in March 1960. Previously served for four and a half years in the Royal Engineers during World War One. Died age 83.	
William H. Blake	11 March 1974	Ypres Town Cemetery	Appointed on 12 November 1919 as a General Clerk (Horticultural Department), and worked in France. Promoted to Quantity Surveyor's Clerk in June 1920, to Special Contracts Clerk in May 1922, and Junior Quantity Surveyor in July 1923. Left the Commission in March 1931. War service as an Acting Sergeant in the Royal Army Service Corps.	
Robert Henry Brown	17 July 1964	Ypres Town Cemetery	Appointed as a Pupil Gardener on 24 February 1947, and worked in the North West European District. Later promoted to Gardener Caretaker. Died in post age 35.	
Thomas Brown	20 September 1951	Ypres Town Cemetery Extension	Appointed Gardener in October 1922. Promoted to Gardener Caretaker in April 1928. Died age 63. Served with the Royal Army Medical Corps during World War One.	
Joseph Francis Cassin	2 February 1970	Ypres Town Cemetery Extension	Joined the IWGC as a Gardener's Labourer in March 1920. Promoted to Gardener Caretaker in October 1927. Retired from the CWGC in May 1960. Previously served in the Royal Field Artillery for five years. Was evacuated from Ypres in May 1940 and worked various labourer jobs until his return to Belgium in November 1945. Died age 74.	
Arthur Chesterman	15 August 1950	Ypres Town Cemetery Extension	Died age 56. Served in the South Lancashire Regiment during the First World War. Also buried with his wife, Marie Louise Chesterman.	
Henry Clark	21 April 1935	Ypres Town Cemetery	Appointed as a Gardener on 15 February 1922, and proceeded to work in France. Promoted to Gardener Caretaker on 1 October 1927, and then to Head Gardener on 1 April 1928. Transferred back to Gardener Caretaker on 19 October 1931. War service as a Private in the 1st Bn. Royal Fusiliers (City of London Regiment).	
Richard Collick B.E.M.	21 March 1986	Ypres Town Cemetery Extension	Joined the IWGC in February 1920 as a Carpenter. Promoted to Foreman of Works in April 1921, then to later transferred to Germany from June 1925. Promoted to Superintendent of Works in 1955. Retired in September 1957. Died age 95. Previously served with the Royal Air Force as a Leading Aircraftman during World War One.	
Sydney W. Cripps	29 December 1923	Ypres Town Cemetery Extension	Appointed Gardener in October 1921. Died age 28.	
W. Curtis	30 June 1923	Ypres Town Cemetery	Died age 42. Appointed as a Gardener on 15 June 1921, and proceeded to France. War service as a Sapper with the Royal Engineers.	
James Walter Dodd	26 August 1984	Ypres Town Cemetery	Died age 71.	
John Thomas Drury	9 October 1926	Ypres Town Cemetery	Died age 56. Appointed as a Gardener on 31 August 1923. War service as a Private in an Agriculture Company and the Labour Corps.	
Harry Dunn	23 October 1956	Ypres Town Cemetery Extension	Former IWGC staff.	
William (Billy) Dunn	7 December 1987	Ypres Town Cemetery Extension	Died age 88. Served with the 1st Bn. Worcestershire Regiment from 1917 to 1920.	
Armand Georges Dupres	22 February 1961	Ypres Town Cemetery Extension	Joined the IWGC in 1921 as a Gardener Labourer. Became Head Gardener in 1952. Had previously served with the Devonshire Regiment.	
Harry Fisher	29 September 1999	Ypres Town Cemetery Extension	Died age 74.	
C. F. Ford	11 February 1929	Ypres Town Cemetery Extension	Appointed Gardener Caretaker in July 1927. Died of pleurisy age 37.	
Ian Gilliland	31 May 1978	Ypres Town Cemetery Extension	Appointed Gardener's Labourer at an unknown date.	
Thomas Ephraim Goodwin	20 April 1924	Ypres Town Cemetery	Died age 30. Appointed as an Assistant Gardener on 8 June 1921, and proceeded to France. Served during the First World War as a Private in the Royal West Kent Regiment.	
George Robert Hoyles	5 January 1979	Ypres Town Cemetery Extension	Joined the IWGC in January 1924 as a Gardener's Labourer. Promoted to Gardener in 1927, then to Head Gardener in 1947. Retired from the CWGC in April 1960. Formerly served with the 6th Labour Company during World War One. Died age 83.	
William (Wiff) James	3 August 1947	Ypres Town Cemetery Extension	Appointed Gardener's Labourer in October 1920. Promoted to Gardener Caretaker in October 1927. Died age 51.	
Thomas Henry Little	21 February 1923	Ypres Town Cemetery	Died age 46. Appointed as a Gardener on 9 November 1921, and worked in France. Served during the First World War as a Private in the Royal Army Service Corps.	
John Lobban	22 May 1957	Ypres Town Cemetery Extension	Joined the IWGC as a Gardener's Labourer in March 1922. Promoted to Gardener Caretaker in 1927. Died age 64.	
Harold Herbert Manklow	1 July 1957	Ypres Town Cemetery Extension	Joined the IWGC as a Gardener's Labourer in June 1920. Promoted to Gardener in 1927 then to Gardener Caretaker in 1929. Died age 61.	
William MacDonald	3 March 1967	Ypres Town Cemetery Extension	Appointed Gardener's Labourer in October 1920. By March 1947, had been promoted to Head Gardener. Retired from the CWGC in April 1964. Died age 67.	
Edward Albert Victor Moon Jr.	11 November 1984	Ypres Town Cemetery	Joined the IWGC in November 1946 as a Gardener's Labourer. Retired in 1967 due to ill health. Edward died age 64. Son of IWGC gardener Edward (Ted) Moon, who with his wife Orinde, ran the cafe at Hill 60 between WW1 and WW2.	Edward Moon's grave in Ypres
John Norman	30 October 1925	Ypres Town Cemetery	Appointed as a Gardener's Labourer on 27 April 1921, and proceeded to France. Promoted to Gardener on 14 July 1924. Left the Commission on 30 May 1925. War service as a Private with the East Surrey Regiment.	
John A. Pegg	12 February 1930	Ypres Town Cemetery Extension	Appointed Gardener's Labourer in June 1920. Promoted to Gardener in June 1928. Served with the Middlesex Regiment during World War One. Died age 57.	
Sidney J. Nott	29 November 1934	Ypres Town Cemetery	Appointed as a Gardener on 5 April 1922, and proceeded to France. Promoted to Gardener Caretaker on 1 July 1927. Killed by a tram on 29 November 1934 in Belgium.	
Albert Packer	24 October 1952	Ypres Town Cemetery	Died age 76. Appointed as a Gardener on 21 April 1920, and proceeded to France. Promoted to Foreman Gardener on 7 June 1920, and to Gardener Caretaker on 1 April 1928. Left the Commission on 28 February 1946. Served 3 years during the First World War as a Private in the Royal Army Veterinary Corps.	
Robert Henry Parker	21 October 1984	Ypres Town Cemetery Extension	Died age 69.	
John A. Pegg	12 February 1930	Ypres Town Cemetery Extension	Appointed Gardener's Labourer in June 1920. Promoted to Gardener in June 1928. Served with the Middlesex Regiment during World War One. Died age 57.[2]	
Frederick Ernest Rickett	13 December 1964	Ypres Town Cemetery Extension	Appointed Gardener's Labourer in November 1946. Later promoted to Gardener Caretaker in 1948. Left the CWGC in April 1964. Died age 57.	
Edward S. Rudd	21 October 1981	Ypres Town Cemetery	Died age 62.	
Thomas Alfred Sewell	16 April 1931	Ypres Town Cemetery Extension	Former head gardener of Poelcapelle British Cemetery. Died age 41	
Albert Speed	December 1966	Ypres Town Cemetery	Appointed as a Driver on 23 September 1925, and proceeded to France. Left the Commission on 12 March 1929. Twenty-one years' service in the Royal Marines.	
C. H. Wheeler	29 March 1928	Ypres Town Cemetery	Died age 32. No beginning of employment dates recorded, but was working as a Gardener Caretaker as of 1 July 1927. Died in post on 29 March 1928.	
George Edwin Wolstenholme	22 July 1962	Ypres Town Cemetery	Former IWGC staff. Died age 55.	
Edward Albert Victor (Ted) Moon Sr.	13 September 1950	Zillebeke Churchyard	Died age 55. Served with the Royal Army Service Corps for seven years. Joined the IWGC in 1920. Promoted to Gardener Caretaker in 1928. Also ran the cafe at Hill 60 with his wife Orinde.	

=== Brussels Capital Region ===
Name	Date of death	Burial location	Additional information	Grave photo
Major Frederick Roberts Bader	6 May 1922	Brussels Town Cemetery	Born 1 January 1867 in India. During the Great War Bader served with the Royal Engineers and was badly wounded in 1917. After the war, he took up a role as Contracts Officer in the IWGC. In 1922 he succumbed to his injuries in hospital in St. Omer. He is also the father of the famous WW2 pilot Sir Douglas Bader.	Bader's grave in Brussels
George Edward Augustin (David) Greensill OBE	23 January 1949	Brussels Town Cemetery	First employed by the IWGC in June 1923. Later transferred to Russia in May 1927 and returned to France in June 1927. Appointed Deputy Director or Works in 1937 and later promoted to Deputy Chief Administrative Officer for Europe. During World War One he served as a Lieutenant in the Royal Engineers and as a Wing Commander in the Royal Air Force in World War Two. Died age 53.	David's grave in Brussels
Alfred James White	8 July 1950	Brussels Town Cemetery	Former Officer Caretaker for the IWGC. Died age 58.	Alfred's grave in Brussels
John William Gamble	5 February 1984	Brussels Town Cemetery	Joined the IWGC in September 1920 as a Gardener's Labourer. Promoted to Gardener Caretaker in 1927. Served in the Rifle Brigade during World War One. Retired from the IWGC in September 1958. Died age 90.	John's grave in Brussels

=== Wallonia ===
Name	Date of death	Burial location	Additional information	Grave photo
Peter Moir	24 (or 28) May 1940	Bas-Warneton (Neerwaasten) Communal Cemetery	Joined the IWGC in 1936 as a pupil gardener. He lived and worked in Beaumont-Hamel on the Somme and in 1938 he married Suzanne Mahieu. In September 1939 he was recalled to the Gordon Highlands, sent back to Scotland to train and came back to France in late 1939. As part of the BEF, Peter was sent to Belgium to hold back the German forces from Dunkirk. According to the CWGC, he was killed in action on 24 May 1940, though it is more likely he was killed on 28 May.	Peter Moir's grave
James Fitzgerald	3 April 1970	Mons Communal Cemetery	Died age 71. Hired by the IWGC in 1919, he began working in the Mons area cemeteries. James was arrested in July 1940 and interned in Ilag VIII Tost. His son took over maintenance of the Mons cemeteries in his absence. Whilst imprisoned he studied under head gardener Albert Roberts and passed his Royal Horticultural Society exam in 1942. He was repatriated back to the UK in September 1944 and returned to Mons after the war ended.	James Fitzgerald's grave

=== Luxembourg ===
Name	Date of death	Burial location	Additional information	Grave photo
James Short	13 November 1978	Hotton War Cemetery	Born in 1906. Worked in the IWGC as a Maintenance Labourer. Left the IWGC in May 1957.	The grave of James Short

=== Antwerpen ===
Name	Date of death	Burial location	Additional information	Grave photo
Albert Willy Loe Speed	15 April 1968	Schoonselhof Cemetery	Appointed as temporary Records Clerk Grade III in March 1946, working in the U.K. Speed then moved to Belgium in 1946, working as a driver between April 1947 and September 1951, after which he became a Gardener's Labourer. Promoted to Gardener Caretaker in September 1953.	

== Burials in the Netherlands ==
=== Gelderland ===
Name	Date of death	Burial location	Additional information	Grave photo
Herbert Alaster Denham	31 August 1963	Arnhem Oosterbeek War Cemetery	Born 26 July 1914 in Durham. Joined the IWGC as a Travelling Head Gardener in December 1955. Promoted to Horticultural Superintendent in September 1957, later working primarily in Arras from January 1963. Died age 49.	
Percy Henry Dawson B.E.M.	24 May 1987	Arnhem Oosterbeek War Cemetery	Died age 71.	Dawson's grave in Arnhem
William Frazer Gregory	20 October 1988	Arnhem Oosterbeek War Cemetery	Died age 80.	
Robert Malster	19 October 1983	Groesbeek Canadian War Cemetery	Died age 70.	

=== Noord-Brabant ===
Name	Date of death	Burial location	Additional information	Grave photo
Lewis L. Tombs B.E.M.	10 June 1982	Mierlo War Cemetery	Joined the IWGC as a Gardener's Labourer in November 1948. Promoted to Gardener Caretaker and retired from the CWGC in June 1968. Died age 79.	Tombs' grave in Mierlo

== Burials in Poland ==
Name	Date of death	Burial location	Additional information	Grave photo
Charles Henry Holton	24 April 1941	Rakowicki Cemetery, Kraków	Died age 45. Joined the IWGC in January 1921 in General Duties. Later promoted to Gardener Caretaker in 1929. First IWGC gardener to die in an internment camp during WW2. Previously served in the Royal Engineers during World War One.	Charles' grave in Krakow Grave of Charles Henry Holton
Harold Stanley Coleman Hawkins	1 December 1941	Rakowicki Cemetery, Kraków	Died age 52. Superintendent of Motor Transport, IWGC Arras, 1940. According to an IWGC investigation, Hawkins's son, "did not think he would leave France on account of wife's family and dogs." Arrested and imprisoned by the Germans, Hawkins died in internment 1 December 1941.	Stanley Hawkins' grave Grave of H S C Hawkins
William Robert Meller	13 June 1942	Rakowicki Cemetery, Kraków	Joined the IWGC as a Gardener's Labourer in France in November 1921. Left the IWGC in March 1925, but rejoined in October 1937 and promoted to Junior Gardener Caretaker in April 1940. Arrested in June 1940 and died age 43 as a civilian POW in Poland. Also remembered on the civilian roll of honour in St George's Chapel, Westminster Abbey. Previously served in the Middlesex Regiment during World War One.	Meller's grave in Krakow Grave of W R Meller
James Edwards	5 July 1942	Rakowicki Cemetery, Kraków	Died age 52. Worked for the IWGC from 1922 to 1938. Arrested and imprisoned by the Germans, he died in internment 5 July 1942. Formerly served with the Royal Engineers during the Great War. He was a Gardener-Caretaker in Audruicq.	James Edwards' grave Grave of James Edwards

== Burials in Germany ==
=== Nordrhein-Westfalen ===
Name	Date of death	Burial location	Additional information	Grave photo
Walter J. Bussell	11 April 1924	Cologne Southern Cemetery	Joined the IWGC as a Labourer in Germany in March 1923. Died age 34 due to an accident in service.	
William Andrew Wingens-O'Brien	16 May 1979	Cologne Southern Cemetery	Former CWGC staff.	
George Pearcy	25 December 1980	Cologne Southern Cemetery	Joined the IWGC in May 1924 in Germany as a Casual Labourer. Promoted to Gardening Duties in 1926 and send to France in December 1939. Was later evacuated but returned to Germany in November 1945. Remained a Gardener Caretaker until his retirement from the IWGC in June 1956.	

=== Hamburg ===
Name	Date of death	Burial location	Additional information	Grave photo
Henry Frederick Langley	10 May 1958	Hamburg Cemetery	Appointed Probationary Gatdener in Germany in April 1937. Evacuated back to the UK in August 1939, but returned to Germany in November 1945. Promoted to Head Gardener in December 1949. Retired from the IWGC in October 1957. Died age 65.	

=== Niedersachsen ===
Name	Date of death	Burial location	Additional information	Grave photo
Herbert John Kennet	3 August 2007	Hanover Military Cemetery	Former CWGC staff.	

== Burials in Italy ==
Name	Date of death	Burial location	Additional information	Grave photo
William Herron	28 October 1919	Dueville Communal Cemetery Extension	Died age 25 from sickness whilst working as a Driver the IWGC. Former had served with the Royal Army Service Corps (Motor Transport).	The grave of William Herron
Patrick Edgar Hennessy	7 November 1957	Rome War Cemetery	Joined the IWGC as a Clerk Grade II in June 1947. Promoted to Senior Clerk October that same year. Later promoted to Executive Officer (Southern Region) in August 1957. Died age 35.	Grave of Patrick Edgar Hennessy
Paul Francis Sutor	20 September 1965	Rome War Cemetery	The son of Kenneth Sutor, who worked for the CWGC.	Grave of Paul Francis Sutor
Seth Joshua Perry	29 September 1994	Rome War Cemetery	Died age 79.	Grave of Seth Joshua Perry

== Burials in Greece ==
Name	Date of death	Burial location	Additional information	Grave photo
John Walter Javes	3 November 1920	Mikra British Cemetery, Kalamaria	Died age 29 from diphtheria. Son of John & Rosetta Javes of Ashford, Middlesex. Formerly City of London Yeomanry (Rough Riders). Appointed by the IWGC in March 1920 as a Draughtsman, primarily working in Macedonia.	

== Burials in Cyprus ==
Name	Date of death	Burial location	Additional information	Grave photo
Major Alexander Hunter	16 May 1955	Nicosia War Cemetery	Appointed as a Finance & Accounts Officer in October 1945. Later posted to Cyprus in June 1954. Died age 59.	

== Burials in the United Kingdom ==
Name	Date of death	Burial location	Additional information	Grave photo
Lieutenant Colonel Werner William Thomas Massiah-Palmer OBE	17 February 1919	St Margaret of Antioch, Edgware	Serving as Deputy Assistant Director of Graves Registration and Enquiries; previously had served with the Northumberland Fusiliers.	
Major General Sir Fabian Arthur Goulstone Ware	28 April 1949	Holy Trinity Churchyard, Gloucestershire	Founder of the Imperial War Graves Commission. In 1914 he obtained command of a mobile ambulance unit of the British Red Cross Society. By the end of the war, he had reached the rank of Major General. In 1917, he founded the Imperial War Graves Commission. During WWII he served as Director General of Graves Registration & Enquiries and retired in 1948.	Fabian Ware's gravestone in Amberley
Edward Patrick Kerstin	16 November 1981	Harrogate (Stonefall) Cemetery	Edward served in the Royal Artillery during WWII. Later he was assigned to a Graves Registration Unit and was responsible for inter the dead. At the end of WWII, he took on full time employment with the IWGC and stayed in France; part of his job was looking after cemeteries in the Somme & Vimy area. Paddy, as he was known, dedicated his life to looking after IWGC cemeteries. He was later posted to Tunisia on promotion and became a senior member of staff for the North Africa area. He was murdered at work by one of his locally employed personnel. After his death, the CWGC repatriated Edward home to Harrogate, where he is now interred.	Headstone of Edward Patrick (Paddy) Kerstin
Maynard Pursglove	14 June 1940	Brenchley, Sussex	Maynard Pursglove served as a signaler in the Royal Sussex Regiment during the First World War. In 1920, he began working as a gardener's laborer in France and was promoted to gardener in 1921. In 1940, he escaped the German invasion of France, but died of illness a few weeks after returning to England.	
William Keay Kinnear MBE	2 February 1958	High Wycombe (Cremated)	William was appointed as a Registration Officer on 1 April 1921, after joining the Commission in France. Later he was promoted to Chief Registration Officer on 1929, and then transferred to the UK as an Area Inspector in September 1930. He was awarded his MBE in January 1949. He retired from the IWGC in 1955. William also served during the First World War as a Major with the Essex Regiment.	
Sir Edward Brantwood Maufe	12 December 1974	Uckfield, East Sussex (Cremated)	Appointed Principal Architect for the UK on 20 January 1944. Employment ceased on 31 March 1949, but remained as Honorary Chief Architect & Artistic Adviser to the Commission until his death in 1974.	

== Burials in Africa ==
Name	Date of death	Burial location	Additional information	Grave photo
Lieutenant Colonel George Windham Wright Evans M.B.E.	10 September 1921	Nairobi South Cemetery, Kenya	Appointed Deputy Director of the IWGC in East Africa in May 1920. Died of pneumonia age 46.	
Edmund John Scholtz	24 May 1952	Plumstead Cemetery, Cape Town	Appointed as the Secretary of the South African Agency on 1 April 1940. Died in post on 24 May 1952. Card notes that he was a South African.	
Robert Kett	23 April 1929	Cairo New British Protestant Cemetery	Joined the IWGC in France as a Foreman Gardener in September 1919. Transferred to Palestine as a Horticultural Officer in February 1922, but returned to France as Travelling Superintendent Gardener in May 1922. Spent the next few years travelling between France and Gallipoli. Appointed Area Superintendent for the Eastern District in January 1928. He was killed after being hit by a car in Cairo on 23 April 1929.	
Phillip E. Hughes	3 July 1933	Cairo New British Protestant Cemetery	Former IWGC staff.	
Christopher John Day	14 April 1958	Cairo New British Protestant Cemetery	Appointed Caretaker by the IWGC in September 1929. Previously served in the East Surrey Regiment and Royal Welsh Fusiliers between 1903 and 1918, finishing his career in the Army as a Company Sergeant Major.	

== Burials in Canada ==
Name	Date of death	Burial location	Additional information	Grave photo
Colonel Herbert Tom (Bert) Goodland	13 August 1956	Saint Luke's Anglican Cemetery, Victoria, British Columbia	Deputy Comptroller for the IWGC for France & Belgium from 1919 to 1923. Died age 81.	
