= Mierlo War Cemetery =

Second World War Commonwealth war grave cemetery in The Netherlands

- Commonwealth War Graves Commission
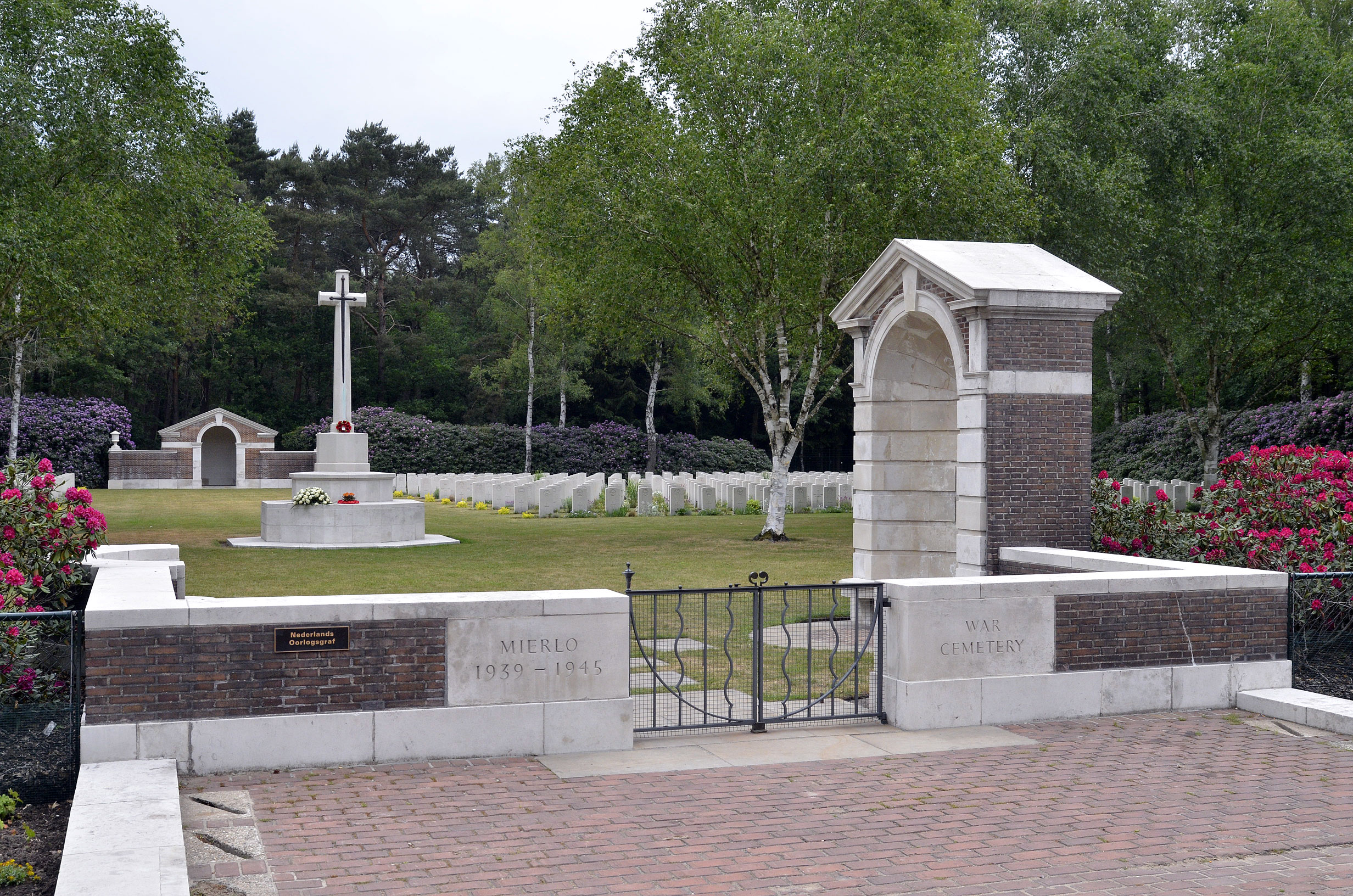
- Mierlo War Cemetery
- Used for those deceased 1944–1945
- Established: Spring 1945
- Location: 51°26′09″N 05°35′49″E near Mierlo, Netherlands
- Total burials: 665
- Unknowns: 7

Burials by nation
- United Kingdom 655; Australia 5 Canada 4 Netherlands 1

Burials by war
- World War II

Mierlo War Cemetery is a Second World War Commonwealth war grave cemetery, located in the village of Mierlo, 12 km (7.5 mi) east of Eindhoven in The Netherlands.

== History ==
The cemetery was created in the spring of 1945. The majority of those buried here had fallen in battles between September and November 1944 in the region south and west of the River Meuse and during the fighting for the Scheldt estuary. The Commonwealth War Graves Commission is responsible for the cemetery.

Of the fallen personnel buried here, 664 are Commonwealth soldiers (seven of whom are unidentified) and one Dutch grave (of G.M. Stönner of the Princess Irene Brigade).

In 1982, an employee of the Commonwealth War Graves Commission was also buried in the cemetery.

The graves are arranged in eight sections (numbered 1 to 8), with six or seven rows in each section (A to F or G).

The Cross of Sacrifice at the cemetery was designed by Sir Reginald Blomfield.

In September 2019 the cemetery was vandalized with graffiti. The damage included letters on the gravestones, a swastika in the chapel and graffiti on the Cross of Sacrifice. There was also the graffiti "MH17 lie" in reference to the shooting down of flight MH17.

Country	Army		Air Force	Total		
Country	known	unknown	Air Force	known	unknown	total
United Kingdom	635	7	13	648	7	648
Australia			5	5		5
Canada	3		1	4		4
Netherlands	1			1		1
Total	639	7	19	658	7	658 (Note: Total doesn't include the unknown burials as a citation cannot be found at present)

== Photographs ==
Pictures of the cemetery
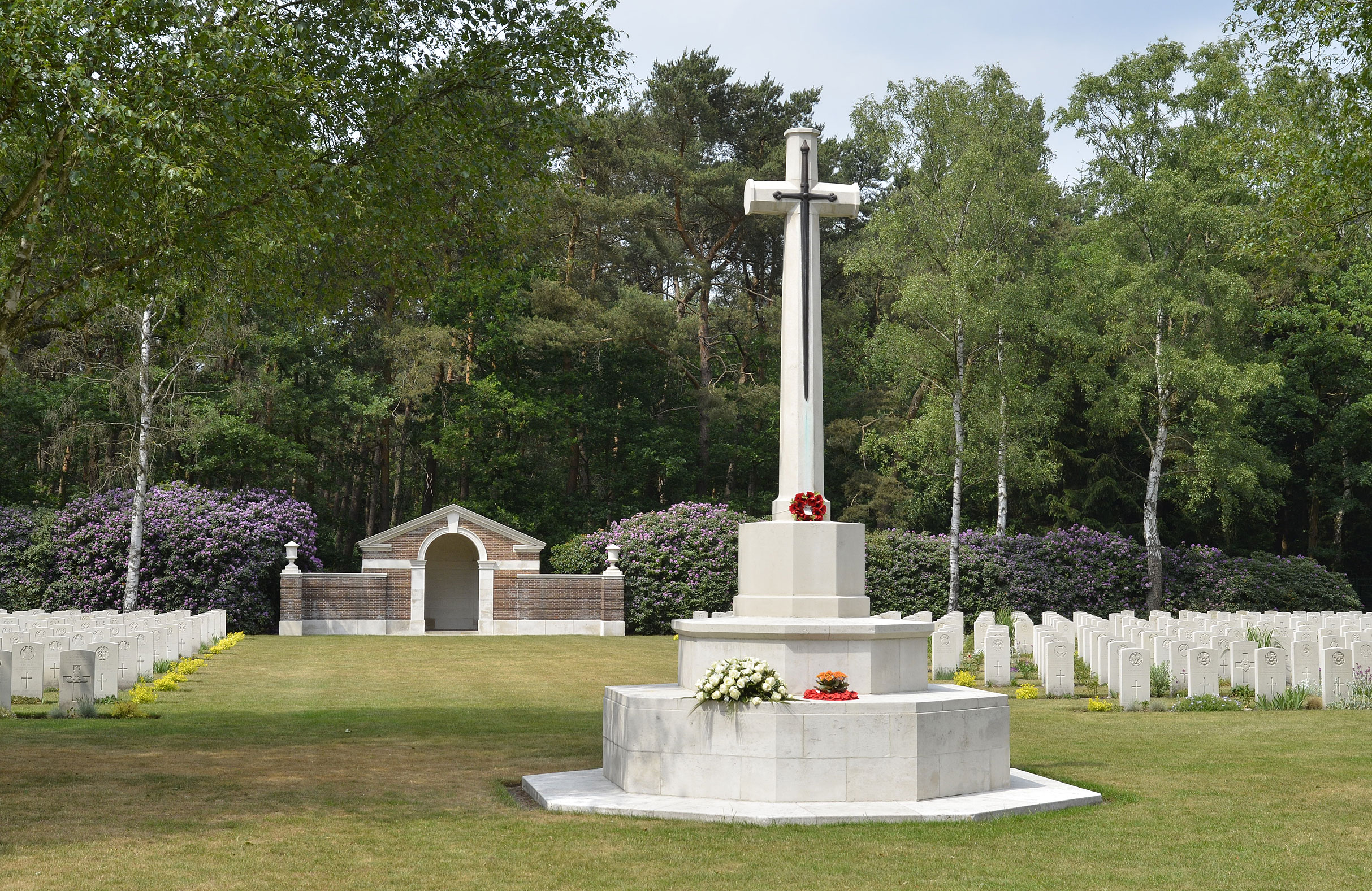
The Cross of Sacrifice

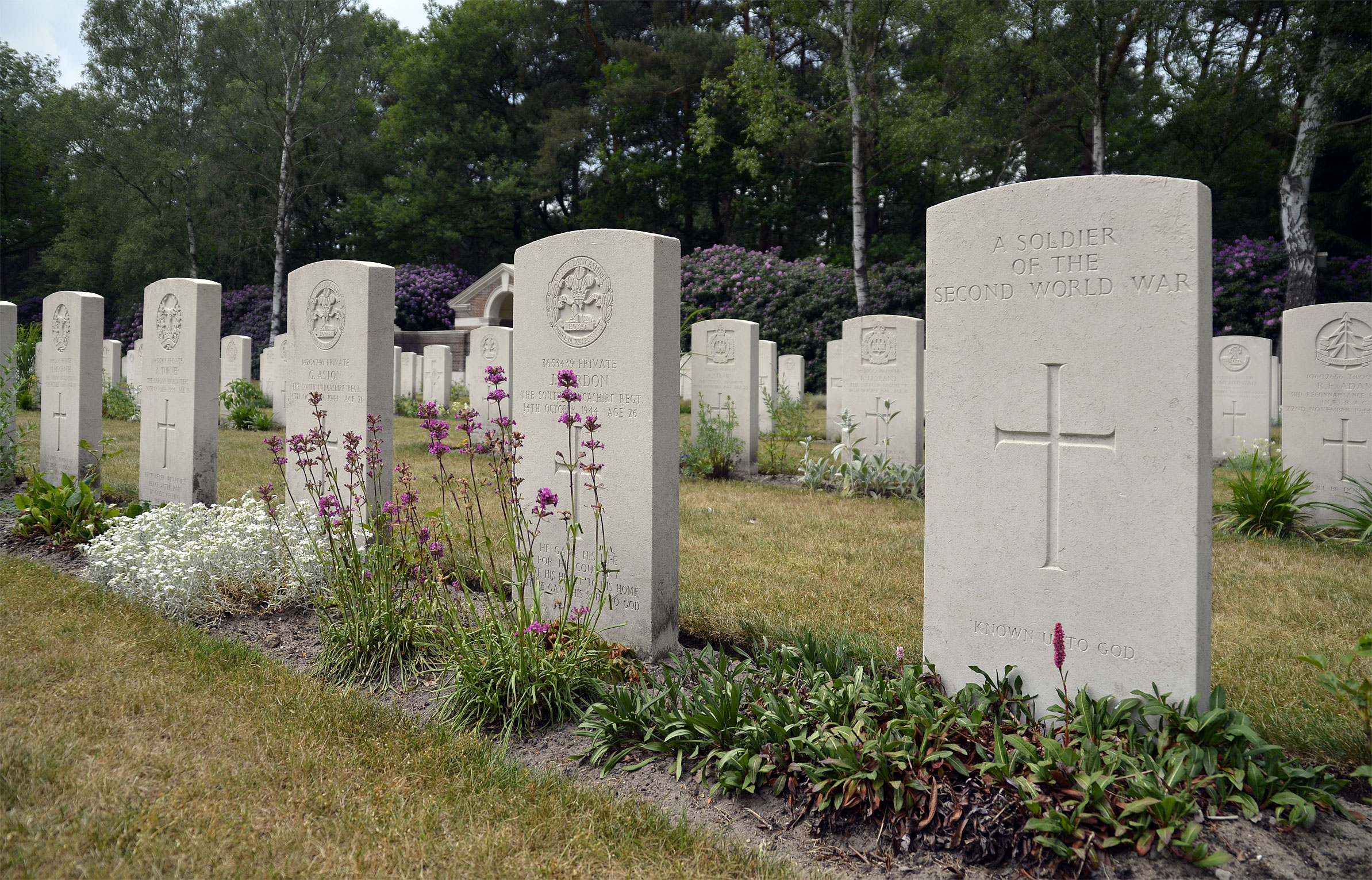
Headstones

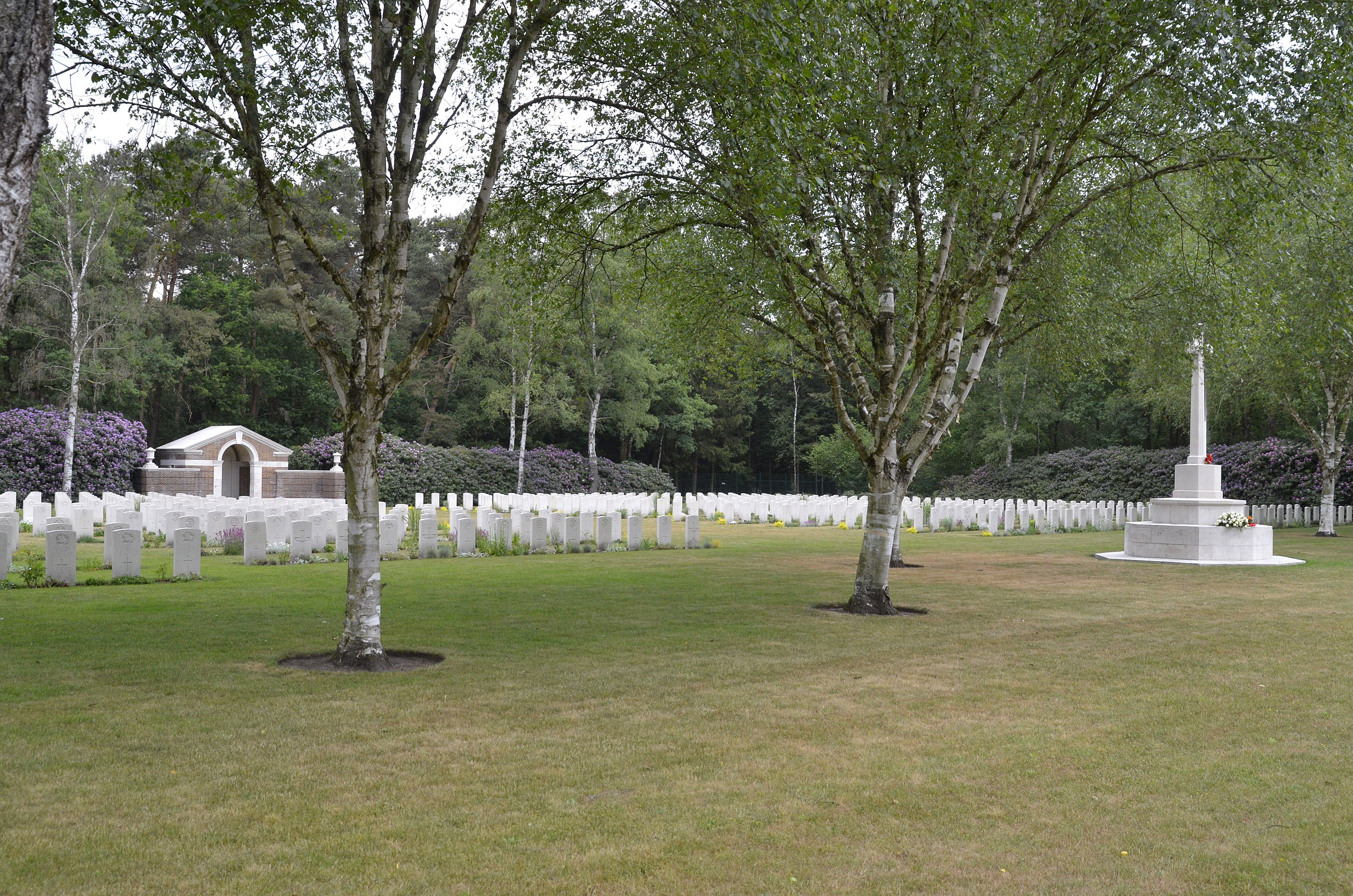
Overview from left

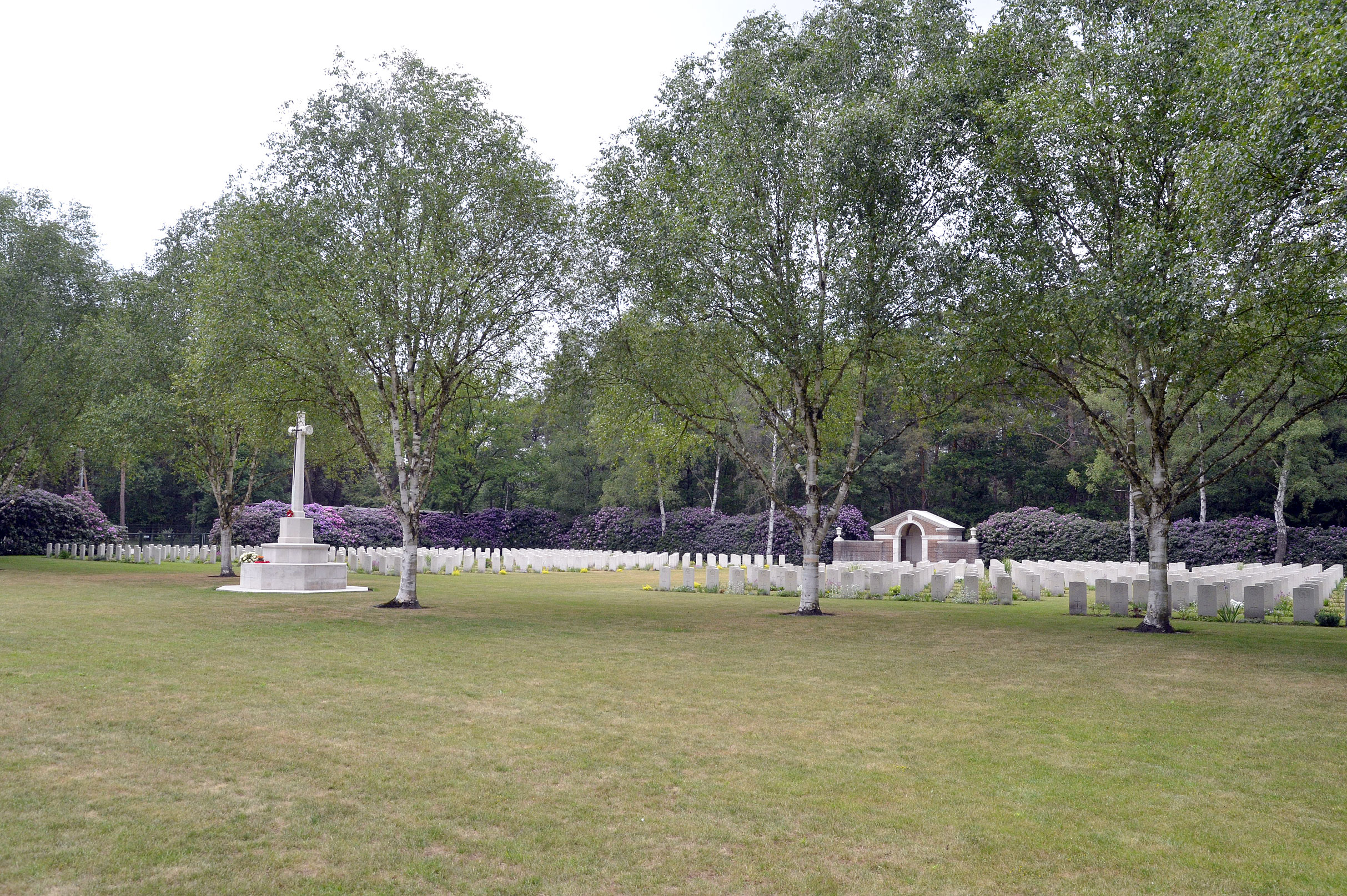
Overview from right

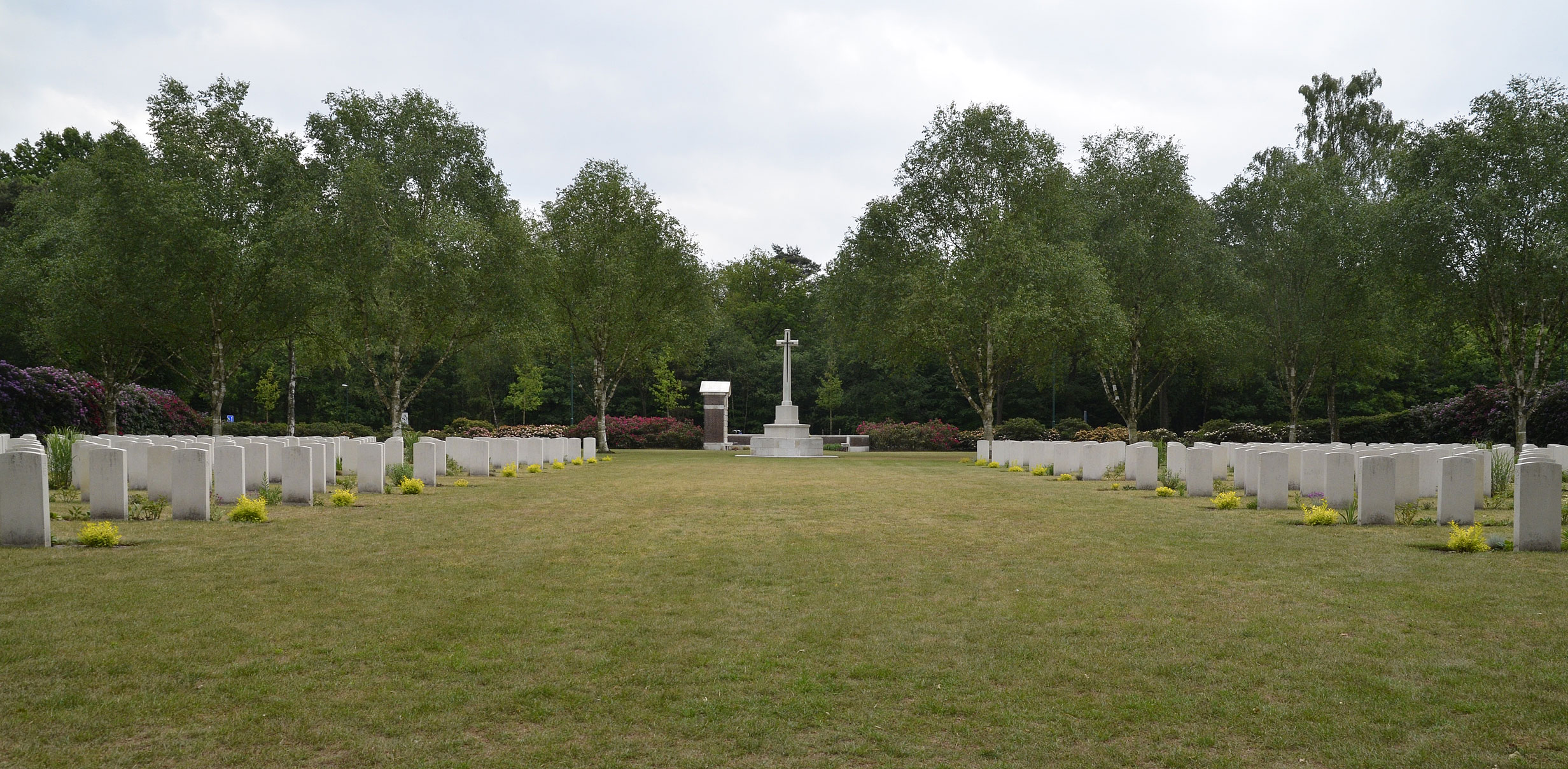
Overview from rear

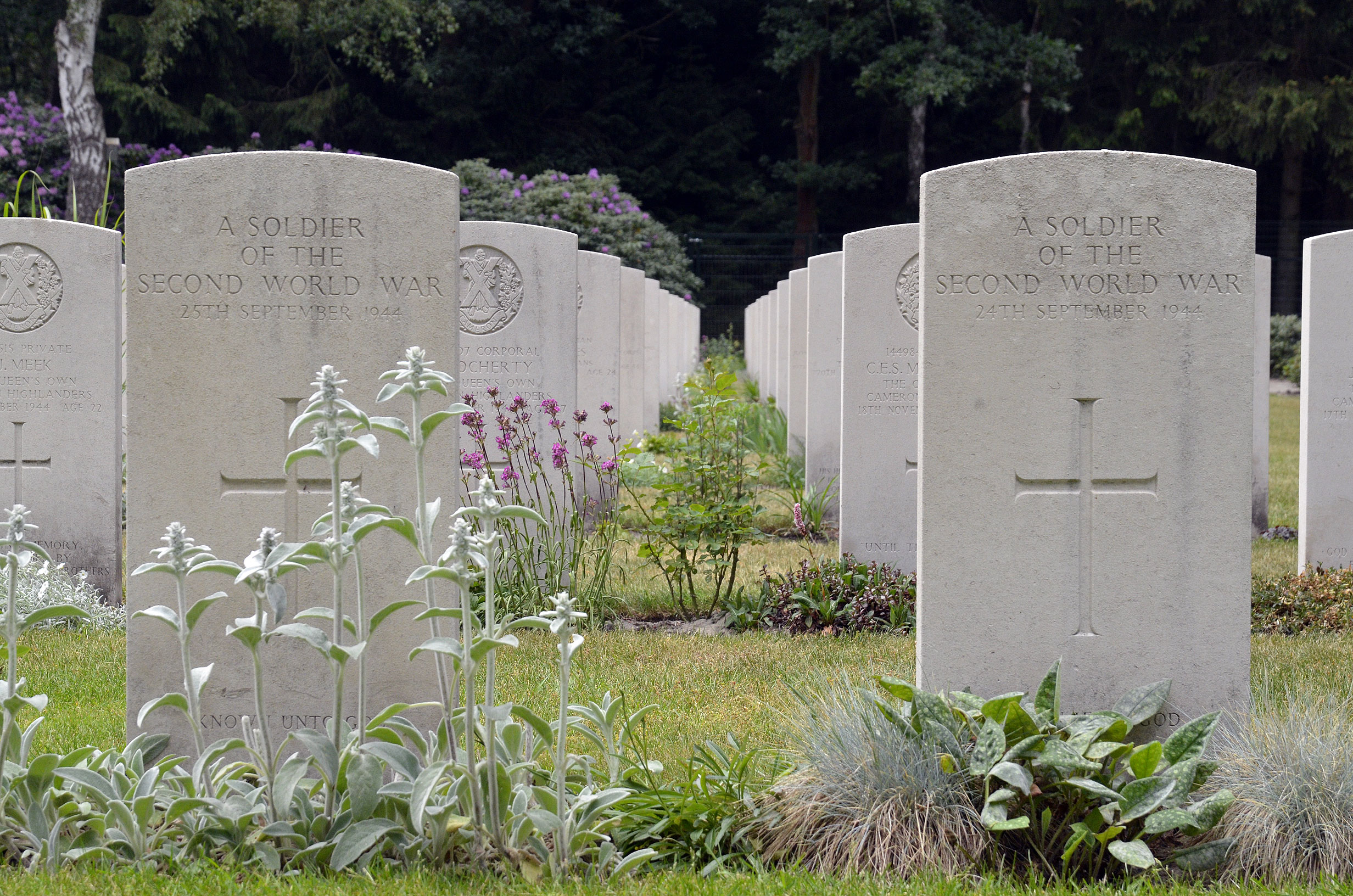
Two headstones of unknown soldiers

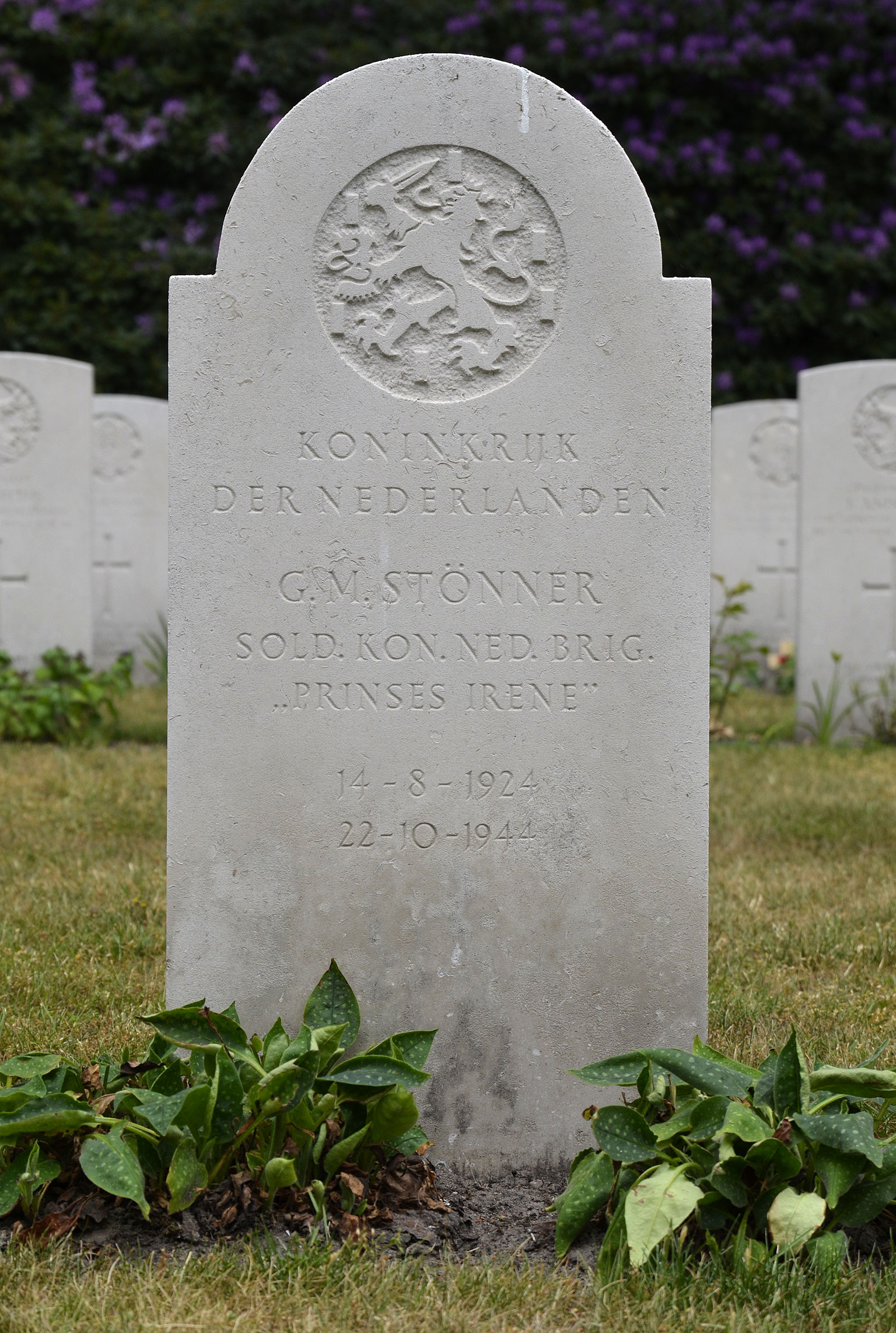
Dutchman's grave
