= Ypres Town Cemetery and Extension =

Military cemetery in Belgium

Ypres Town
- Commonwealth War Graves Commission
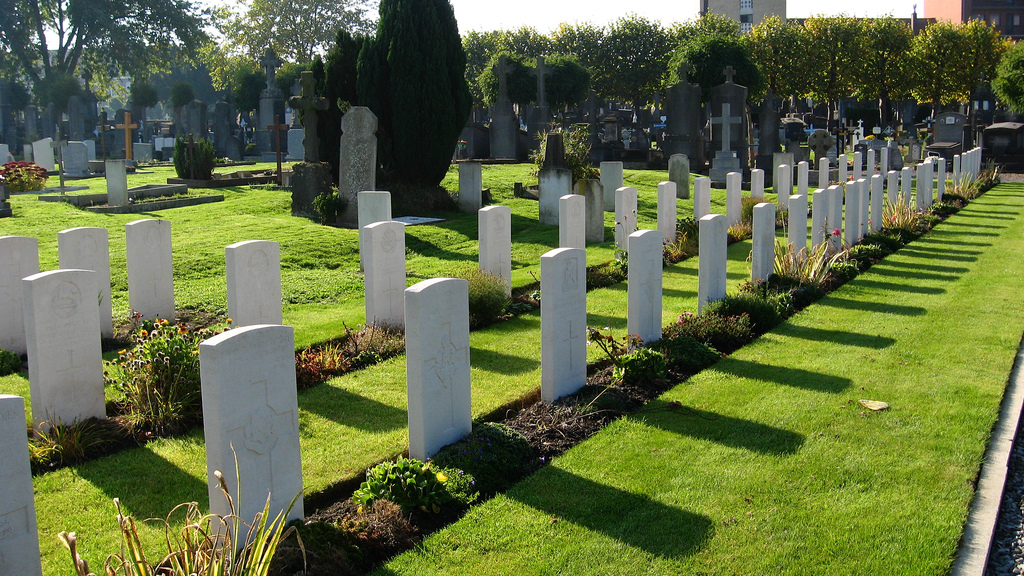
- Used for those deceased 1914–1915, 1918 and 1940
- Established: 1914
- Location: 50°51′12″N 02°53′54″E near Ypres, West Flanders, Belgium
- Designed by: Sir Reginald Blomfield
- Total burials: 145 (cemetery), 643 (extension)
- Unknowns: 150

Burials by nation
- Allies of World War I: United Kingdom: 144 (cemetery), 568 (extension); Canada: 15 (extension); Australia: 13 (extension); South Africa: 1 (extension); Undivided India: 1 (cemetery), 1 (cemetery); Allies of World War II: United Kingdom: 42 (extension); Canada: 1 (extension); Czechoslovakia: 1 (extension); Other: 1 (extension)

Burials by war
- World War I: 145 (cemetery), 598 (extension) World War II: 45 (extension)
- Statistics source: and at wo1.be

Ypres Town Cemetery and Extension is a Commonwealth War Graves Commission burial ground for the dead of the First World War located in Ypres, Belgium, on the Western Front.

The cemetery grounds were assigned to the United Kingdom in perpetuity by King Albert I of Belgium in recognition of the sacrifices made by the British Empire in the defence and liberation of Belgium during the war.

== Foundation ==
Ypres formed a salient in the Western Front of the First World War, with fighting continuously in the area throughout the war. The city, which was destroyed over the course of the conflict, was a forward base for Commonwealth troops. The municipal cemetery for the town was used for burials of dead Commonwealth troops from October 1914, with a military-exclusive extension cemetery being opened next to it at the same time.

The main cemetery and its extension were in use until 1915 and then used again in 1918. The extension was expanded by the concentration of graves from nearby small cemeteries and battlefield burials.

The cemetery and extension were brought into use again in 1940, to receive the dead of Commonwealth forces retreating from the area as it fell to the forces of Nazi Germany.

Between the two cemeteries and the two wars, 788 men are buried here. The sites are also used by the Commonwealth War Graves Commission for its own permanent staff and their families, with alternative designs of headstones slightly set apart.

The cemetery and extension were designed by Sir Reginald Blomfield.

== Notable graves ==
- Prince Maurice of Battenberg, a grandson of Queen Victoria, is buried in the town cemetery.

== Gallery ==
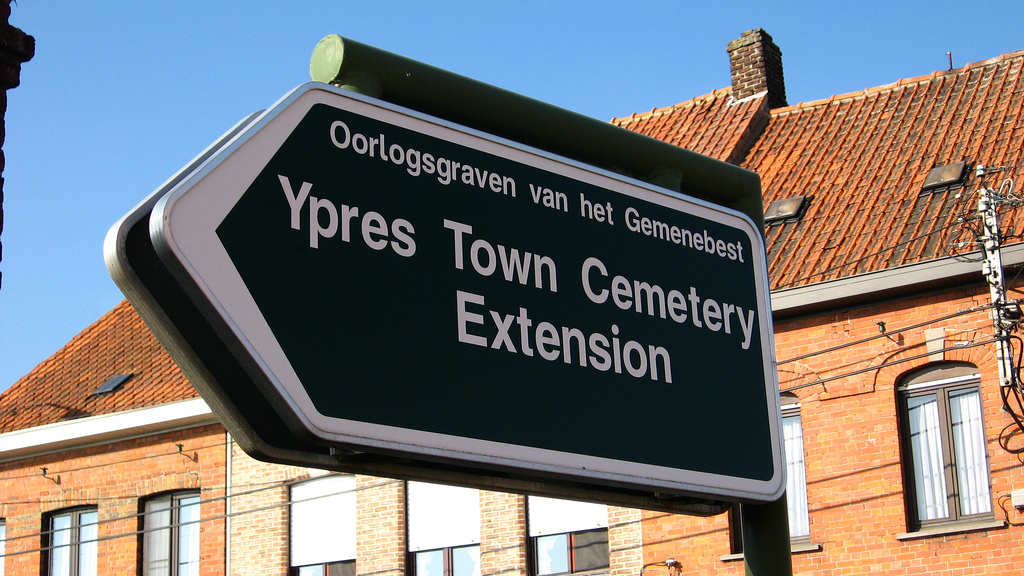
Sign pointing to the extension

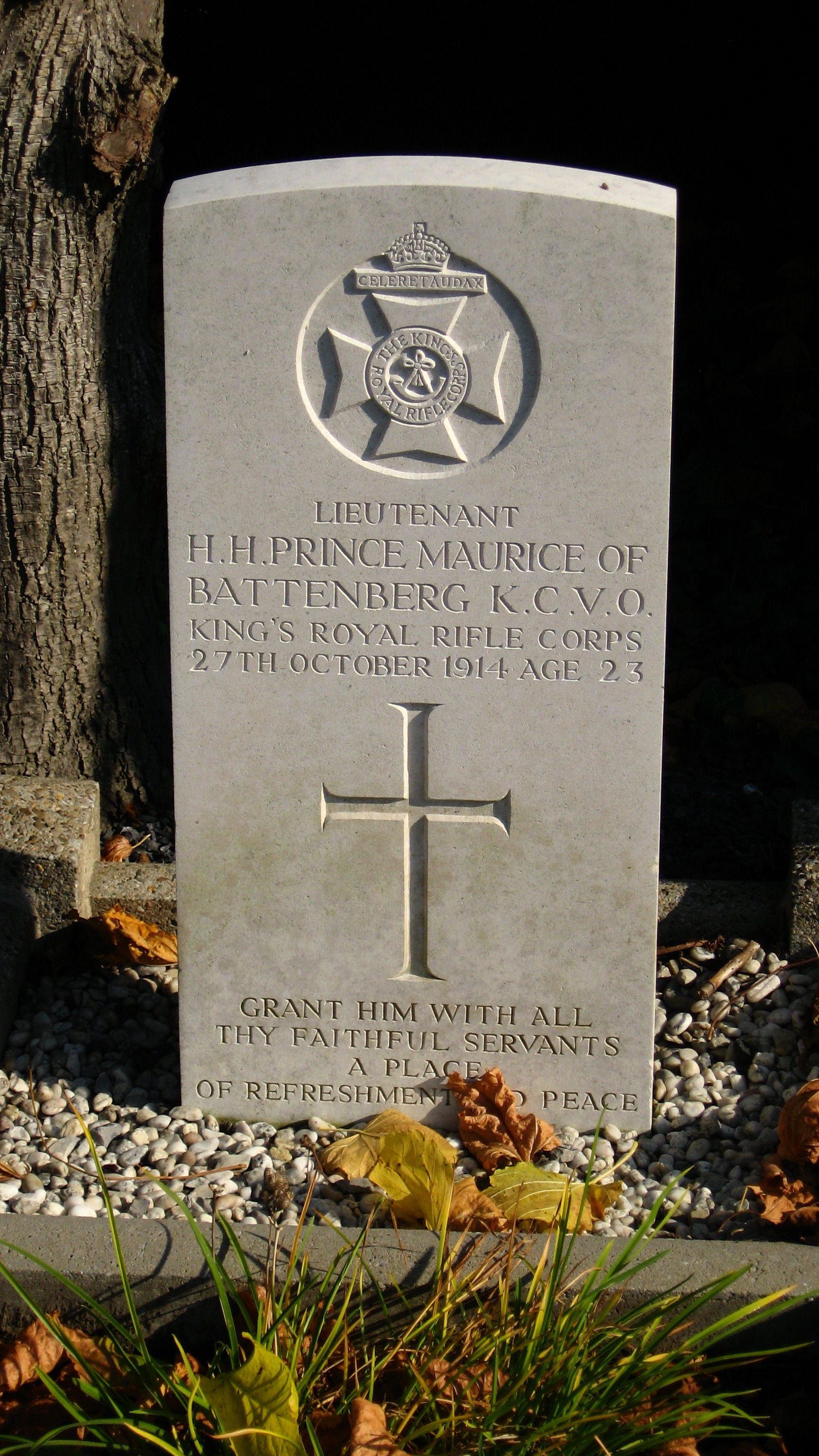
Grave of Prince Maurice of Battenberg
